

133001–133100 

|-bgcolor=#E9E9E9
| 133001 ||  || — || October 10, 2002 || Socorro || LINEAR || — || align=right | 2.6 km || 
|-id=002 bgcolor=#d6d6d6
| 133002 ||  || — || October 10, 2002 || Socorro || LINEAR || INA || align=right | 7.6 km || 
|-id=003 bgcolor=#d6d6d6
| 133003 ||  || — || October 10, 2002 || Socorro || LINEAR || — || align=right | 11 km || 
|-id=004 bgcolor=#d6d6d6
| 133004 ||  || — || October 10, 2002 || Socorro || LINEAR || — || align=right | 5.2 km || 
|-id=005 bgcolor=#d6d6d6
| 133005 ||  || — || October 11, 2002 || Socorro || LINEAR || — || align=right | 5.8 km || 
|-id=006 bgcolor=#d6d6d6
| 133006 ||  || — || October 12, 2002 || Socorro || LINEAR || — || align=right | 7.1 km || 
|-id=007 bgcolor=#d6d6d6
| 133007 Audreysimmons ||  ||  || October 5, 2002 || Apache Point || SDSS || — || align=right | 5.1 km || 
|-id=008 bgcolor=#d6d6d6
| 133008 Snedden ||  ||  || October 5, 2002 || Apache Point || SDSS || — || align=right | 4.9 km || 
|-id=009 bgcolor=#d6d6d6
| 133009 Watters ||  ||  || October 10, 2002 || Apache Point || SDSS || — || align=right | 6.0 km || 
|-id=010 bgcolor=#d6d6d6
| 133010 ||  || — || October 28, 2002 || Palomar || NEAT || HYG || align=right | 5.2 km || 
|-id=011 bgcolor=#d6d6d6
| 133011 ||  || — || October 28, 2002 || Palomar || NEAT || — || align=right | 6.5 km || 
|-id=012 bgcolor=#d6d6d6
| 133012 ||  || — || October 30, 2002 || Haleakala || NEAT || 7:4 || align=right | 6.3 km || 
|-id=013 bgcolor=#d6d6d6
| 133013 ||  || — || October 30, 2002 || Haleakala || NEAT || EOS || align=right | 5.4 km || 
|-id=014 bgcolor=#d6d6d6
| 133014 ||  || — || October 31, 2002 || Socorro || LINEAR || — || align=right | 7.4 km || 
|-id=015 bgcolor=#d6d6d6
| 133015 ||  || — || November 3, 2002 || Palomar || NEAT || EUP || align=right | 6.8 km || 
|-id=016 bgcolor=#d6d6d6
| 133016 ||  || — || November 1, 2002 || Palomar || NEAT || SYL7:4 || align=right | 9.0 km || 
|-id=017 bgcolor=#d6d6d6
| 133017 ||  || — || November 5, 2002 || Socorro || LINEAR || — || align=right | 6.1 km || 
|-id=018 bgcolor=#d6d6d6
| 133018 ||  || — || November 6, 2002 || Anderson Mesa || LONEOS || — || align=right | 4.0 km || 
|-id=019 bgcolor=#d6d6d6
| 133019 ||  || — || November 6, 2002 || Anderson Mesa || LONEOS || — || align=right | 7.3 km || 
|-id=020 bgcolor=#d6d6d6
| 133020 ||  || — || November 5, 2002 || Socorro || LINEAR || — || align=right | 6.5 km || 
|-id=021 bgcolor=#E9E9E9
| 133021 ||  || — || November 7, 2002 || Socorro || LINEAR || — || align=right | 4.7 km || 
|-id=022 bgcolor=#d6d6d6
| 133022 ||  || — || November 7, 2002 || Socorro || LINEAR || — || align=right | 8.7 km || 
|-id=023 bgcolor=#E9E9E9
| 133023 ||  || — || November 12, 2002 || Socorro || LINEAR || — || align=right | 4.7 km || 
|-id=024 bgcolor=#d6d6d6
| 133024 ||  || — || November 12, 2002 || Palomar || NEAT || — || align=right | 4.2 km || 
|-id=025 bgcolor=#d6d6d6
| 133025 ||  || — || November 13, 2002 || Palomar || NEAT || — || align=right | 4.7 km || 
|-id=026 bgcolor=#E9E9E9
| 133026 ||  || — || November 27, 2002 || Anderson Mesa || LONEOS || — || align=right | 4.9 km || 
|-id=027 bgcolor=#FA8072
| 133027 ||  || — || December 3, 2002 || Palomar || NEAT || — || align=right | 1.0 km || 
|-id=028 bgcolor=#E9E9E9
| 133028 ||  || — || December 6, 2002 || Socorro || LINEAR || — || align=right | 3.1 km || 
|-id=029 bgcolor=#fefefe
| 133029 ||  || — || December 10, 2002 || Socorro || LINEAR || H || align=right | 1.2 km || 
|-id=030 bgcolor=#FA8072
| 133030 ||  || — || December 13, 2002 || Socorro || LINEAR || H || align=right | 1.0 km || 
|-id=031 bgcolor=#d6d6d6
| 133031 ||  || — || December 5, 2002 || Socorro || LINEAR || EOS || align=right | 4.2 km || 
|-id=032 bgcolor=#d6d6d6
| 133032 ||  || — || December 5, 2002 || Socorro || LINEAR || — || align=right | 4.9 km || 
|-id=033 bgcolor=#fefefe
| 133033 ||  || — || December 27, 2002 || Socorro || LINEAR || H || align=right | 1.0 km || 
|-id=034 bgcolor=#fefefe
| 133034 ||  || — || December 28, 2002 || Ametlla de Mar || Ametlla de Mar Obs. || H || align=right | 1.3 km || 
|-id=035 bgcolor=#fefefe
| 133035 ||  || — || January 2, 2003 || Socorro || LINEAR || H || align=right | 1.4 km || 
|-id=036 bgcolor=#fefefe
| 133036 ||  || — || January 1, 2003 || Socorro || LINEAR || H || align=right | 1.0 km || 
|-id=037 bgcolor=#E9E9E9
| 133037 ||  || — || January 3, 2003 || Socorro || LINEAR || — || align=right | 5.5 km || 
|-id=038 bgcolor=#E9E9E9
| 133038 ||  || — || January 1, 2003 || Socorro || LINEAR || — || align=right | 2.4 km || 
|-id=039 bgcolor=#FA8072
| 133039 ||  || — || January 7, 2003 || Socorro || LINEAR || — || align=right data-sort-value="0.73" | 730 m || 
|-id=040 bgcolor=#fefefe
| 133040 ||  || — || January 27, 2003 || Haleakala || NEAT || H || align=right data-sort-value="0.94" | 940 m || 
|-id=041 bgcolor=#d6d6d6
| 133041 ||  || — || January 27, 2003 || Socorro || LINEAR || EMA || align=right | 6.5 km || 
|-id=042 bgcolor=#fefefe
| 133042 ||  || — || January 28, 2003 || Socorro || LINEAR || H || align=right data-sort-value="0.83" | 830 m || 
|-id=043 bgcolor=#FA8072
| 133043 ||  || — || January 29, 2003 || Palomar || NEAT || — || align=right data-sort-value="0.95" | 950 m || 
|-id=044 bgcolor=#fefefe
| 133044 ||  || — || January 29, 2003 || Socorro || LINEAR || H || align=right data-sort-value="0.85" | 850 m || 
|-id=045 bgcolor=#d6d6d6
| 133045 ||  || — || January 29, 2003 || Socorro || LINEAR || EUP || align=right | 8.9 km || 
|-id=046 bgcolor=#fefefe
| 133046 ||  || — || January 31, 2003 || Anderson Mesa || LONEOS || H || align=right data-sort-value="0.84" | 840 m || 
|-id=047 bgcolor=#d6d6d6
| 133047 ||  || — || February 1, 2003 || Anderson Mesa || LONEOS || — || align=right | 4.9 km || 
|-id=048 bgcolor=#FA8072
| 133048 ||  || — || February 4, 2003 || Anderson Mesa || LONEOS || — || align=right | 4.3 km || 
|-id=049 bgcolor=#fefefe
| 133049 ||  || — || February 24, 2003 || Bergisch Gladbach || W. Bickel || H || align=right | 1.1 km || 
|-id=050 bgcolor=#E9E9E9
| 133050 ||  || — || February 21, 2003 || Palomar || NEAT || — || align=right | 1.6 km || 
|-id=051 bgcolor=#fefefe
| 133051 || 2003 EH || — || March 2, 2003 || Socorro || LINEAR || H || align=right | 1.4 km || 
|-id=052 bgcolor=#fefefe
| 133052 ||  || — || March 2, 2003 || Socorro || LINEAR || H || align=right | 1.5 km || 
|-id=053 bgcolor=#fefefe
| 133053 ||  || — || March 8, 2003 || Anderson Mesa || LONEOS || H || align=right data-sort-value="0.85" | 850 m || 
|-id=054 bgcolor=#fefefe
| 133054 ||  || — || March 8, 2003 || Socorro || LINEAR || H || align=right | 1.8 km || 
|-id=055 bgcolor=#fefefe
| 133055 ||  || — || March 8, 2003 || Socorro || LINEAR || H || align=right | 1.7 km || 
|-id=056 bgcolor=#E9E9E9
| 133056 ||  || — || March 6, 2003 || Socorro || LINEAR || — || align=right | 2.4 km || 
|-id=057 bgcolor=#fefefe
| 133057 ||  || — || March 11, 2003 || Socorro || LINEAR || H || align=right | 1.7 km || 
|-id=058 bgcolor=#fefefe
| 133058 ||  || — || March 11, 2003 || Socorro || LINEAR || H || align=right | 1.4 km || 
|-id=059 bgcolor=#FA8072
| 133059 ||  || — || March 9, 2003 || Socorro || LINEAR || — || align=right | 2.2 km || 
|-id=060 bgcolor=#fefefe
| 133060 ||  || — || March 29, 2003 || Anderson Mesa || LONEOS || H || align=right | 1.6 km || 
|-id=061 bgcolor=#fefefe
| 133061 ||  || — || March 22, 2003 || Palomar || NEAT || V || align=right | 1.4 km || 
|-id=062 bgcolor=#fefefe
| 133062 ||  || — || March 23, 2003 || Palomar || NEAT || H || align=right | 1.5 km || 
|-id=063 bgcolor=#fefefe
| 133063 ||  || — || March 23, 2003 || Kitt Peak || Spacewatch || FLO || align=right | 1.5 km || 
|-id=064 bgcolor=#fefefe
| 133064 ||  || — || March 24, 2003 || Kitt Peak || Spacewatch || — || align=right | 1.2 km || 
|-id=065 bgcolor=#fefefe
| 133065 ||  || — || March 25, 2003 || Haleakala || NEAT || FLO || align=right | 2.1 km || 
|-id=066 bgcolor=#fefefe
| 133066 ||  || — || March 30, 2003 || Kitt Peak || M. W. Buie || V || align=right | 1.9 km || 
|-id=067 bgcolor=#C2E0FF
| 133067 ||  || — || March 30, 2003 || Kitt Peak || M. W. Buie || plutino || align=right | 185 km || 
|-id=068 bgcolor=#fefefe
| 133068 Lisaschulze ||  ||  || April 21, 2003 || Catalina || CSS || — || align=right | 1.4 km || 
|-id=069 bgcolor=#fefefe
| 133069 ||  || — || April 28, 2003 || Anderson Mesa || LONEOS || FLO || align=right | 1.5 km || 
|-id=070 bgcolor=#fefefe
| 133070 ||  || — || April 26, 2003 || Kitt Peak || Spacewatch || — || align=right | 1.2 km || 
|-id=071 bgcolor=#fefefe
| 133071 ||  || — || April 27, 2003 || Socorro || LINEAR || V || align=right | 1.0 km || 
|-id=072 bgcolor=#fefefe
| 133072 ||  || — || April 29, 2003 || Socorro || LINEAR || — || align=right | 1.4 km || 
|-id=073 bgcolor=#fefefe
| 133073 ||  || — || April 28, 2003 || Socorro || LINEAR || PHO || align=right | 4.1 km || 
|-id=074 bgcolor=#fefefe
| 133074 Kenshamordola ||  ||  || April 21, 2003 || Catalina || CSS || — || align=right | 1.7 km || 
|-id=075 bgcolor=#fefefe
| 133075 ||  || — || May 1, 2003 || Kitt Peak || Spacewatch || — || align=right | 1.4 km || 
|-id=076 bgcolor=#fefefe
| 133076 ||  || — || May 2, 2003 || Socorro || LINEAR || — || align=right | 1.4 km || 
|-id=077 bgcolor=#fefefe
| 133077 Jirsík ||  ||  || May 4, 2003 || Kleť || J. Tichá, M. Tichý || — || align=right | 1.2 km || 
|-id=078 bgcolor=#fefefe
| 133078 ||  || — || May 5, 2003 || Anderson Mesa || LONEOS || PHO || align=right | 2.6 km || 
|-id=079 bgcolor=#fefefe
| 133079 ||  || — || May 11, 2003 || Reedy Creek || J. Broughton || FLO || align=right | 1.1 km || 
|-id=080 bgcolor=#fefefe
| 133080 ||  || — || May 26, 2003 || Kitt Peak || Spacewatch || — || align=right | 1.6 km || 
|-id=081 bgcolor=#fefefe
| 133081 ||  || — || May 25, 2003 || Haleakala || NEAT || — || align=right | 1.3 km || 
|-id=082 bgcolor=#fefefe
| 133082 ||  || — || May 29, 2003 || Nashville || R. Clingan || — || align=right | 1.3 km || 
|-id=083 bgcolor=#fefefe
| 133083 ||  || — || June 22, 2003 || Anderson Mesa || LONEOS || FLO || align=right | 1.9 km || 
|-id=084 bgcolor=#fefefe
| 133084 ||  || — || June 26, 2003 || Socorro || LINEAR || — || align=right | 1.3 km || 
|-id=085 bgcolor=#fefefe
| 133085 ||  || — || June 26, 2003 || Socorro || LINEAR || — || align=right | 1.6 km || 
|-id=086 bgcolor=#fefefe
| 133086 ||  || — || June 26, 2003 || Socorro || LINEAR || FLO || align=right | 1.1 km || 
|-id=087 bgcolor=#fefefe
| 133087 ||  || — || June 26, 2003 || Socorro || LINEAR || — || align=right | 1.7 km || 
|-id=088 bgcolor=#E9E9E9
| 133088 ||  || — || June 26, 2003 || Anderson Mesa || LONEOS || HNS || align=right | 3.5 km || 
|-id=089 bgcolor=#E9E9E9
| 133089 ||  || — || June 28, 2003 || Socorro || LINEAR || — || align=right | 2.5 km || 
|-id=090 bgcolor=#FA8072
| 133090 ||  || — || June 26, 2003 || Socorro || LINEAR || — || align=right | 1.8 km || 
|-id=091 bgcolor=#E9E9E9
| 133091 ||  || — || June 29, 2003 || Socorro || LINEAR || TIN || align=right | 2.0 km || 
|-id=092 bgcolor=#fefefe
| 133092 ||  || — || June 27, 2003 || Anderson Mesa || LONEOS || NYS || align=right | 1.2 km || 
|-id=093 bgcolor=#fefefe
| 133093 || 2003 NP || — || July 1, 2003 || Socorro || LINEAR || — || align=right | 1.3 km || 
|-id=094 bgcolor=#E9E9E9
| 133094 ||  || — || July 5, 2003 || Reedy Creek || J. Broughton || — || align=right | 5.6 km || 
|-id=095 bgcolor=#fefefe
| 133095 ||  || — || July 7, 2003 || Reedy Creek || J. Broughton || NYS || align=right | 1.2 km || 
|-id=096 bgcolor=#fefefe
| 133096 ||  || — || July 8, 2003 || Palomar || NEAT || NYS || align=right | 3.1 km || 
|-id=097 bgcolor=#E9E9E9
| 133097 ||  || — || July 8, 2003 || Palomar || NEAT || — || align=right | 2.2 km || 
|-id=098 bgcolor=#fefefe
| 133098 ||  || — || July 7, 2003 || Palomar || NEAT || — || align=right | 2.4 km || 
|-id=099 bgcolor=#fefefe
| 133099 ||  || — || July 3, 2003 || Kitt Peak || Spacewatch || — || align=right | 1.2 km || 
|-id=100 bgcolor=#fefefe
| 133100 ||  || — || July 18, 2003 || Haleakala || NEAT || NYS || align=right | 1.6 km || 
|}

133101–133200 

|-bgcolor=#fefefe
| 133101 ||  || — || July 22, 2003 || Haleakala || NEAT || FLO || align=right data-sort-value="0.95" | 950 m || 
|-id=102 bgcolor=#fefefe
| 133102 ||  || — || July 23, 2003 || Palomar || NEAT || V || align=right | 1.2 km || 
|-id=103 bgcolor=#fefefe
| 133103 ||  || — || July 24, 2003 || Campo Imperatore || CINEOS || ERI || align=right | 2.3 km || 
|-id=104 bgcolor=#E9E9E9
| 133104 ||  || — || July 26, 2003 || Reedy Creek || J. Broughton || HEN || align=right | 2.2 km || 
|-id=105 bgcolor=#fefefe
| 133105 ||  || — || July 25, 2003 || Socorro || LINEAR || MAS || align=right | 1.6 km || 
|-id=106 bgcolor=#fefefe
| 133106 ||  || — || July 27, 2003 || Reedy Creek || J. Broughton || — || align=right | 1.4 km || 
|-id=107 bgcolor=#fefefe
| 133107 ||  || — || July 27, 2003 || Reedy Creek || J. Broughton || — || align=right | 2.9 km || 
|-id=108 bgcolor=#fefefe
| 133108 ||  || — || July 28, 2003 || Reedy Creek || J. Broughton || — || align=right | 1.6 km || 
|-id=109 bgcolor=#fefefe
| 133109 ||  || — || July 25, 2003 || Socorro || LINEAR || — || align=right | 2.3 km || 
|-id=110 bgcolor=#d6d6d6
| 133110 ||  || — || July 30, 2003 || Socorro || LINEAR || — || align=right | 6.0 km || 
|-id=111 bgcolor=#fefefe
| 133111 ||  || — || July 31, 2003 || Reedy Creek || J. Broughton || NYS || align=right | 1.2 km || 
|-id=112 bgcolor=#d6d6d6
| 133112 ||  || — || July 29, 2003 || Campo Imperatore || CINEOS || — || align=right | 4.0 km || 
|-id=113 bgcolor=#fefefe
| 133113 ||  || — || July 30, 2003 || Socorro || LINEAR || — || align=right | 1.7 km || 
|-id=114 bgcolor=#fefefe
| 133114 ||  || — || July 30, 2003 || Socorro || LINEAR || NYS || align=right | 3.1 km || 
|-id=115 bgcolor=#fefefe
| 133115 ||  || — || July 24, 2003 || Palomar || NEAT || — || align=right | 1.4 km || 
|-id=116 bgcolor=#fefefe
| 133116 ||  || — || July 24, 2003 || Palomar || NEAT || V || align=right | 1.3 km || 
|-id=117 bgcolor=#fefefe
| 133117 ||  || — || July 24, 2003 || Palomar || NEAT || — || align=right | 1.5 km || 
|-id=118 bgcolor=#fefefe
| 133118 ||  || — || July 24, 2003 || Palomar || NEAT || NYS || align=right | 1.2 km || 
|-id=119 bgcolor=#d6d6d6
| 133119 ||  || — || July 24, 2003 || Palomar || NEAT || — || align=right | 4.5 km || 
|-id=120 bgcolor=#fefefe
| 133120 ||  || — || July 30, 2003 || Socorro || LINEAR || — || align=right | 1.4 km || 
|-id=121 bgcolor=#E9E9E9
| 133121 ||  || — || July 29, 2003 || Campo Imperatore || CINEOS || HNS || align=right | 2.1 km || 
|-id=122 bgcolor=#E9E9E9
| 133122 ||  || — || July 30, 2003 || Socorro || LINEAR || — || align=right | 5.9 km || 
|-id=123 bgcolor=#fefefe
| 133123 ||  || — || August 1, 2003 || Haleakala || NEAT || ERI || align=right | 3.1 km || 
|-id=124 bgcolor=#fefefe
| 133124 ||  || — || August 1, 2003 || Haleakala || NEAT || NYS || align=right | 1.4 km || 
|-id=125 bgcolor=#fefefe
| 133125 ||  || — || August 2, 2003 || Haleakala || NEAT || FLO || align=right | 1.3 km || 
|-id=126 bgcolor=#E9E9E9
| 133126 ||  || — || August 2, 2003 || Haleakala || NEAT || — || align=right | 3.2 km || 
|-id=127 bgcolor=#fefefe
| 133127 ||  || — || August 2, 2003 || Haleakala || NEAT || NYS || align=right | 3.1 km || 
|-id=128 bgcolor=#fefefe
| 133128 ||  || — || August 2, 2003 || Haleakala || NEAT || FLO || align=right | 1.4 km || 
|-id=129 bgcolor=#fefefe
| 133129 ||  || — || August 2, 2003 || Haleakala || NEAT || — || align=right | 1.2 km || 
|-id=130 bgcolor=#fefefe
| 133130 ||  || — || August 1, 2003 || Socorro || LINEAR || — || align=right | 1.5 km || 
|-id=131 bgcolor=#E9E9E9
| 133131 ||  || — || August 2, 2003 || Haleakala || NEAT || — || align=right | 1.9 km || 
|-id=132 bgcolor=#fefefe
| 133132 ||  || — || August 2, 2003 || Haleakala || NEAT || — || align=right | 1.3 km || 
|-id=133 bgcolor=#fefefe
| 133133 ||  || — || August 4, 2003 || Socorro || LINEAR || — || align=right | 1.4 km || 
|-id=134 bgcolor=#fefefe
| 133134 ||  || — || August 5, 2003 || Socorro || LINEAR || FLO || align=right | 1.2 km || 
|-id=135 bgcolor=#fefefe
| 133135 ||  || — || August 5, 2003 || Socorro || LINEAR || V || align=right | 1.1 km || 
|-id=136 bgcolor=#d6d6d6
| 133136 ||  || — || August 19, 2003 || Campo Imperatore || CINEOS || — || align=right | 4.6 km || 
|-id=137 bgcolor=#fefefe
| 133137 ||  || — || August 18, 2003 || Haleakala || NEAT || V || align=right | 1.1 km || 
|-id=138 bgcolor=#E9E9E9
| 133138 ||  || — || August 18, 2003 || Campo Imperatore || CINEOS || — || align=right | 1.8 km || 
|-id=139 bgcolor=#fefefe
| 133139 ||  || — || August 20, 2003 || Haleakala || NEAT || — || align=right | 1.2 km || 
|-id=140 bgcolor=#fefefe
| 133140 ||  || — || August 21, 2003 || Palomar || NEAT || NYS || align=right | 1.1 km || 
|-id=141 bgcolor=#fefefe
| 133141 ||  || — || August 21, 2003 || Palomar || NEAT || FLO || align=right | 1.4 km || 
|-id=142 bgcolor=#fefefe
| 133142 ||  || — || August 20, 2003 || Campo Imperatore || CINEOS || V || align=right | 1.1 km || 
|-id=143 bgcolor=#d6d6d6
| 133143 ||  || — || August 21, 2003 || Palomar || NEAT || — || align=right | 4.4 km || 
|-id=144 bgcolor=#d6d6d6
| 133144 ||  || — || August 22, 2003 || Haleakala || NEAT || — || align=right | 4.3 km || 
|-id=145 bgcolor=#fefefe
| 133145 ||  || — || August 20, 2003 || Palomar || NEAT || — || align=right | 1.4 km || 
|-id=146 bgcolor=#E9E9E9
| 133146 ||  || — || August 21, 2003 || Campo Imperatore || CINEOS || — || align=right | 4.5 km || 
|-id=147 bgcolor=#fefefe
| 133147 ||  || — || August 22, 2003 || Palomar || NEAT || NYS || align=right | 1.4 km || 
|-id=148 bgcolor=#fefefe
| 133148 ||  || — || August 22, 2003 || Palomar || NEAT || — || align=right | 1.5 km || 
|-id=149 bgcolor=#fefefe
| 133149 ||  || — || August 22, 2003 || Socorro || LINEAR || NYS || align=right | 1.1 km || 
|-id=150 bgcolor=#E9E9E9
| 133150 ||  || — || August 22, 2003 || Palomar || NEAT || — || align=right | 1.5 km || 
|-id=151 bgcolor=#E9E9E9
| 133151 ||  || — || August 22, 2003 || Palomar || NEAT || — || align=right | 4.4 km || 
|-id=152 bgcolor=#d6d6d6
| 133152 ||  || — || August 22, 2003 || Palomar || NEAT || — || align=right | 4.7 km || 
|-id=153 bgcolor=#E9E9E9
| 133153 ||  || — || August 22, 2003 || Palomar || NEAT || — || align=right | 3.2 km || 
|-id=154 bgcolor=#fefefe
| 133154 ||  || — || August 20, 2003 || Campo Imperatore || CINEOS || V || align=right | 1.2 km || 
|-id=155 bgcolor=#fefefe
| 133155 ||  || — || August 21, 2003 || Palomar || NEAT || — || align=right | 1.8 km || 
|-id=156 bgcolor=#fefefe
| 133156 ||  || — || August 22, 2003 || Palomar || NEAT || FLO || align=right | 1.6 km || 
|-id=157 bgcolor=#d6d6d6
| 133157 ||  || — || August 22, 2003 || Haleakala || NEAT || — || align=right | 4.6 km || 
|-id=158 bgcolor=#d6d6d6
| 133158 ||  || — || August 23, 2003 || Campo Imperatore || CINEOS || — || align=right | 6.6 km || 
|-id=159 bgcolor=#fefefe
| 133159 ||  || — || August 22, 2003 || Reedy Creek || J. Broughton || — || align=right | 2.1 km || 
|-id=160 bgcolor=#fefefe
| 133160 ||  || — || August 24, 2003 || Reedy Creek || J. Broughton || — || align=right | 1.8 km || 
|-id=161 bgcolor=#d6d6d6
| 133161 Ruttkai ||  ||  || August 24, 2003 || Piszkéstető || K. Sárneczky, B. Sipőcz || EOS || align=right | 2.9 km || 
|-id=162 bgcolor=#E9E9E9
| 133162 ||  || — || August 21, 2003 || Palomar || NEAT || — || align=right | 5.3 km || 
|-id=163 bgcolor=#fefefe
| 133163 ||  || — || August 21, 2003 || Haleakala || NEAT || PHO || align=right | 2.1 km || 
|-id=164 bgcolor=#fefefe
| 133164 ||  || — || August 22, 2003 || Palomar || NEAT || NYS || align=right | 1.3 km || 
|-id=165 bgcolor=#fefefe
| 133165 ||  || — || August 22, 2003 || Socorro || LINEAR || — || align=right | 1.2 km || 
|-id=166 bgcolor=#E9E9E9
| 133166 ||  || — || August 22, 2003 || Palomar || NEAT || — || align=right | 1.6 km || 
|-id=167 bgcolor=#fefefe
| 133167 ||  || — || August 22, 2003 || Socorro || LINEAR || NYS || align=right | 1.1 km || 
|-id=168 bgcolor=#fefefe
| 133168 ||  || — || August 22, 2003 || Socorro || LINEAR || — || align=right | 1.3 km || 
|-id=169 bgcolor=#fefefe
| 133169 ||  || — || August 22, 2003 || Socorro || LINEAR || NYS || align=right | 1.2 km || 
|-id=170 bgcolor=#d6d6d6
| 133170 ||  || — || August 22, 2003 || Socorro || LINEAR || — || align=right | 7.9 km || 
|-id=171 bgcolor=#d6d6d6
| 133171 ||  || — || August 22, 2003 || Socorro || LINEAR || TIR || align=right | 5.8 km || 
|-id=172 bgcolor=#d6d6d6
| 133172 ||  || — || August 22, 2003 || Socorro || LINEAR || — || align=right | 5.3 km || 
|-id=173 bgcolor=#E9E9E9
| 133173 ||  || — || August 22, 2003 || Socorro || LINEAR || — || align=right | 2.4 km || 
|-id=174 bgcolor=#fefefe
| 133174 ||  || — || August 23, 2003 || Socorro || LINEAR || V || align=right | 1.1 km || 
|-id=175 bgcolor=#d6d6d6
| 133175 ||  || — || August 24, 2003 || Socorro || LINEAR || HYG || align=right | 3.0 km || 
|-id=176 bgcolor=#fefefe
| 133176 ||  || — || August 24, 2003 || Palomar || NEAT || — || align=right | 1.6 km || 
|-id=177 bgcolor=#E9E9E9
| 133177 ||  || — || August 20, 2003 || Palomar || NEAT || — || align=right | 3.2 km || 
|-id=178 bgcolor=#fefefe
| 133178 ||  || — || August 20, 2003 || Palomar || NEAT || — || align=right | 1.4 km || 
|-id=179 bgcolor=#fefefe
| 133179 ||  || — || August 21, 2003 || Haleakala || NEAT || — || align=right | 1.7 km || 
|-id=180 bgcolor=#d6d6d6
| 133180 ||  || — || August 22, 2003 || Palomar || NEAT || — || align=right | 4.7 km || 
|-id=181 bgcolor=#fefefe
| 133181 ||  || — || August 22, 2003 || Palomar || NEAT || — || align=right | 1.4 km || 
|-id=182 bgcolor=#fefefe
| 133182 ||  || — || August 22, 2003 || Palomar || NEAT || NYS || align=right | 2.7 km || 
|-id=183 bgcolor=#fefefe
| 133183 ||  || — || August 23, 2003 || Palomar || NEAT || — || align=right | 2.8 km || 
|-id=184 bgcolor=#d6d6d6
| 133184 ||  || — || August 23, 2003 || Socorro || LINEAR || EUP || align=right | 6.4 km || 
|-id=185 bgcolor=#fefefe
| 133185 ||  || — || August 23, 2003 || Socorro || LINEAR || — || align=right | 1.3 km || 
|-id=186 bgcolor=#E9E9E9
| 133186 ||  || — || August 23, 2003 || Socorro || LINEAR || — || align=right | 1.6 km || 
|-id=187 bgcolor=#fefefe
| 133187 ||  || — || August 23, 2003 || Socorro || LINEAR || NYS || align=right | 1.3 km || 
|-id=188 bgcolor=#fefefe
| 133188 ||  || — || August 23, 2003 || Socorro || LINEAR || NYS || align=right | 1.4 km || 
|-id=189 bgcolor=#fefefe
| 133189 ||  || — || August 23, 2003 || Socorro || LINEAR || NYS || align=right | 1.2 km || 
|-id=190 bgcolor=#fefefe
| 133190 ||  || — || August 23, 2003 || Socorro || LINEAR || — || align=right | 1.7 km || 
|-id=191 bgcolor=#fefefe
| 133191 ||  || — || August 23, 2003 || Socorro || LINEAR || — || align=right | 1.7 km || 
|-id=192 bgcolor=#fefefe
| 133192 ||  || — || August 23, 2003 || Socorro || LINEAR || — || align=right | 1.6 km || 
|-id=193 bgcolor=#fefefe
| 133193 ||  || — || August 23, 2003 || Socorro || LINEAR || FLO || align=right | 1.2 km || 
|-id=194 bgcolor=#d6d6d6
| 133194 ||  || — || August 23, 2003 || Socorro || LINEAR || EOS || align=right | 3.8 km || 
|-id=195 bgcolor=#fefefe
| 133195 ||  || — || August 23, 2003 || Socorro || LINEAR || — || align=right | 1.6 km || 
|-id=196 bgcolor=#E9E9E9
| 133196 ||  || — || August 23, 2003 || Socorro || LINEAR || — || align=right | 2.6 km || 
|-id=197 bgcolor=#fefefe
| 133197 ||  || — || August 23, 2003 || Socorro || LINEAR || ERI || align=right | 4.0 km || 
|-id=198 bgcolor=#fefefe
| 133198 ||  || — || August 23, 2003 || Socorro || LINEAR || NYS || align=right | 1.5 km || 
|-id=199 bgcolor=#d6d6d6
| 133199 ||  || — || August 23, 2003 || Socorro || LINEAR || LUT || align=right | 9.8 km || 
|-id=200 bgcolor=#E9E9E9
| 133200 ||  || — || August 23, 2003 || Socorro || LINEAR || — || align=right | 4.4 km || 
|}

133201–133300 

|-bgcolor=#E9E9E9
| 133201 ||  || — || August 23, 2003 || Socorro || LINEAR || GEF || align=right | 2.7 km || 
|-id=202 bgcolor=#fefefe
| 133202 ||  || — || August 23, 2003 || Socorro || LINEAR || — || align=right | 1.9 km || 
|-id=203 bgcolor=#E9E9E9
| 133203 ||  || — || August 23, 2003 || Socorro || LINEAR || — || align=right | 1.8 km || 
|-id=204 bgcolor=#E9E9E9
| 133204 ||  || — || August 23, 2003 || Socorro || LINEAR || — || align=right | 5.6 km || 
|-id=205 bgcolor=#E9E9E9
| 133205 ||  || — || August 23, 2003 || Socorro || LINEAR || — || align=right | 4.8 km || 
|-id=206 bgcolor=#fefefe
| 133206 ||  || — || August 22, 2003 || Socorro || LINEAR || — || align=right | 1.4 km || 
|-id=207 bgcolor=#fefefe
| 133207 ||  || — || August 22, 2003 || Socorro || LINEAR || EUT || align=right | 1.4 km || 
|-id=208 bgcolor=#E9E9E9
| 133208 ||  || — || August 25, 2003 || Socorro || LINEAR || — || align=right | 1.5 km || 
|-id=209 bgcolor=#fefefe
| 133209 ||  || — || August 25, 2003 || Socorro || LINEAR || NYS || align=right | 2.0 km || 
|-id=210 bgcolor=#fefefe
| 133210 ||  || — || August 25, 2003 || Reedy Creek || J. Broughton || — || align=right | 1.5 km || 
|-id=211 bgcolor=#fefefe
| 133211 ||  || — || August 23, 2003 || Palomar || NEAT || V || align=right | 1.3 km || 
|-id=212 bgcolor=#fefefe
| 133212 ||  || — || August 24, 2003 || Socorro || LINEAR || — || align=right | 1.2 km || 
|-id=213 bgcolor=#d6d6d6
| 133213 ||  || — || August 26, 2003 || Črni Vrh || H. Mikuž || — || align=right | 5.6 km || 
|-id=214 bgcolor=#d6d6d6
| 133214 ||  || — || August 24, 2003 || Socorro || LINEAR || EUP || align=right | 7.5 km || 
|-id=215 bgcolor=#fefefe
| 133215 ||  || — || August 24, 2003 || Socorro || LINEAR || FLO || align=right | 1.2 km || 
|-id=216 bgcolor=#E9E9E9
| 133216 ||  || — || August 24, 2003 || Socorro || LINEAR || JUN || align=right | 1.8 km || 
|-id=217 bgcolor=#E9E9E9
| 133217 ||  || — || August 24, 2003 || Socorro || LINEAR || DOR || align=right | 4.4 km || 
|-id=218 bgcolor=#fefefe
| 133218 ||  || — || August 24, 2003 || Socorro || LINEAR || — || align=right | 1.4 km || 
|-id=219 bgcolor=#E9E9E9
| 133219 ||  || — || August 24, 2003 || Socorro || LINEAR || ADE || align=right | 5.9 km || 
|-id=220 bgcolor=#fefefe
| 133220 ||  || — || August 25, 2003 || Reedy Creek || J. Broughton || V || align=right | 1.2 km || 
|-id=221 bgcolor=#d6d6d6
| 133221 ||  || — || August 23, 2003 || Socorro || LINEAR || — || align=right | 4.0 km || 
|-id=222 bgcolor=#E9E9E9
| 133222 ||  || — || August 24, 2003 || Socorro || LINEAR || — || align=right | 4.3 km || 
|-id=223 bgcolor=#fefefe
| 133223 ||  || — || August 25, 2003 || Socorro || LINEAR || NYS || align=right | 2.7 km || 
|-id=224 bgcolor=#E9E9E9
| 133224 ||  || — || August 25, 2003 || Socorro || LINEAR || CLO || align=right | 4.3 km || 
|-id=225 bgcolor=#d6d6d6
| 133225 ||  || — || August 25, 2003 || Socorro || LINEAR || — || align=right | 4.2 km || 
|-id=226 bgcolor=#fefefe
| 133226 ||  || — || August 27, 2003 || Palomar || NEAT || — || align=right | 1.5 km || 
|-id=227 bgcolor=#E9E9E9
| 133227 ||  || — || August 29, 2003 || Haleakala || NEAT || — || align=right | 4.0 km || 
|-id=228 bgcolor=#E9E9E9
| 133228 ||  || — || August 31, 2003 || Pla D'Arguines || Pla D'Arguines Obs. || — || align=right | 2.3 km || 
|-id=229 bgcolor=#fefefe
| 133229 ||  || — || August 28, 2003 || Haleakala || NEAT || V || align=right | 1.2 km || 
|-id=230 bgcolor=#fefefe
| 133230 ||  || — || August 28, 2003 || Haleakala || NEAT || — || align=right | 2.9 km || 
|-id=231 bgcolor=#fefefe
| 133231 ||  || — || August 31, 2003 || Haleakala || NEAT || — || align=right | 1.6 km || 
|-id=232 bgcolor=#E9E9E9
| 133232 ||  || — || August 31, 2003 || Haleakala || NEAT || — || align=right | 5.8 km || 
|-id=233 bgcolor=#d6d6d6
| 133233 ||  || — || August 30, 2003 || Kitt Peak || Spacewatch || — || align=right | 4.4 km || 
|-id=234 bgcolor=#fefefe
| 133234 ||  || — || August 31, 2003 || Kitt Peak || Spacewatch || MAS || align=right | 1.2 km || 
|-id=235 bgcolor=#E9E9E9
| 133235 ||  || — || August 30, 2003 || Kitt Peak || Spacewatch || — || align=right | 3.8 km || 
|-id=236 bgcolor=#fefefe
| 133236 ||  || — || August 31, 2003 || Socorro || LINEAR || — || align=right | 1.4 km || 
|-id=237 bgcolor=#fefefe
| 133237 ||  || — || August 31, 2003 || Socorro || LINEAR || — || align=right | 1.7 km || 
|-id=238 bgcolor=#fefefe
| 133238 ||  || — || August 31, 2003 || Socorro || LINEAR || — || align=right | 1.3 km || 
|-id=239 bgcolor=#E9E9E9
| 133239 ||  || — || August 31, 2003 || Socorro || LINEAR || — || align=right | 2.1 km || 
|-id=240 bgcolor=#fefefe
| 133240 ||  || — || August 31, 2003 || Socorro || LINEAR || — || align=right | 1.3 km || 
|-id=241 bgcolor=#fefefe
| 133241 ||  || — || August 31, 2003 || Socorro || LINEAR || — || align=right | 1.8 km || 
|-id=242 bgcolor=#fefefe
| 133242 ||  || — || August 31, 2003 || Haleakala || NEAT || — || align=right | 1.4 km || 
|-id=243 bgcolor=#E9E9E9
| 133243 Essen ||  ||  || September 2, 2003 || Essen || T. Payer || — || align=right | 2.1 km || 
|-id=244 bgcolor=#fefefe
| 133244 ||  || — || September 1, 2003 || Socorro || LINEAR || LCI || align=right | 2.1 km || 
|-id=245 bgcolor=#fefefe
| 133245 ||  || — || September 1, 2003 || Socorro || LINEAR || — || align=right | 1.9 km || 
|-id=246 bgcolor=#E9E9E9
| 133246 ||  || — || September 1, 2003 || Socorro || LINEAR || — || align=right | 2.4 km || 
|-id=247 bgcolor=#E9E9E9
| 133247 ||  || — || September 1, 2003 || Socorro || LINEAR || MAR || align=right | 2.5 km || 
|-id=248 bgcolor=#fefefe
| 133248 ||  || — || September 1, 2003 || Socorro || LINEAR || V || align=right | 1.2 km || 
|-id=249 bgcolor=#FA8072
| 133249 ||  || — || September 1, 2003 || Socorro || LINEAR || — || align=right | 1.4 km || 
|-id=250 bgcolor=#E9E9E9
| 133250 Rubik ||  ||  || September 5, 2003 || Piszkéstető || K. Sárneczky, B. Sipőcz || — || align=right | 2.2 km || 
|-id=251 bgcolor=#fefefe
| 133251 ||  || — || September 4, 2003 || Socorro || LINEAR || — || align=right | 2.1 km || 
|-id=252 bgcolor=#E9E9E9
| 133252 ||  || — || September 8, 2003 || Haleakala || NEAT || — || align=right | 3.6 km || 
|-id=253 bgcolor=#E9E9E9
| 133253 ||  || — || September 14, 2003 || Haleakala || NEAT || — || align=right | 4.4 km || 
|-id=254 bgcolor=#d6d6d6
| 133254 ||  || — || September 15, 2003 || Haleakala || NEAT || ALA || align=right | 5.9 km || 
|-id=255 bgcolor=#fefefe
| 133255 ||  || — || September 14, 2003 || Haleakala || NEAT || V || align=right | 1.4 km || 
|-id=256 bgcolor=#E9E9E9
| 133256 ||  || — || September 15, 2003 || Palomar || NEAT || MAR || align=right | 2.6 km || 
|-id=257 bgcolor=#d6d6d6
| 133257 ||  || — || September 15, 2003 || Anderson Mesa || LONEOS || — || align=right | 3.7 km || 
|-id=258 bgcolor=#E9E9E9
| 133258 ||  || — || September 15, 2003 || Anderson Mesa || LONEOS || AST || align=right | 4.2 km || 
|-id=259 bgcolor=#d6d6d6
| 133259 ||  || — || September 15, 2003 || Anderson Mesa || LONEOS || KOR || align=right | 2.5 km || 
|-id=260 bgcolor=#fefefe
| 133260 ||  || — || September 13, 2003 || Haleakala || NEAT || NYS || align=right | 1.4 km || 
|-id=261 bgcolor=#E9E9E9
| 133261 ||  || — || September 14, 2003 || Palomar || NEAT || — || align=right | 1.9 km || 
|-id=262 bgcolor=#E9E9E9
| 133262 ||  || — || September 3, 2003 || Haleakala || NEAT || — || align=right | 2.1 km || 
|-id=263 bgcolor=#d6d6d6
| 133263 ||  || — || September 16, 2003 || Palomar || NEAT || — || align=right | 3.6 km || 
|-id=264 bgcolor=#E9E9E9
| 133264 ||  || — || September 16, 2003 || Kitt Peak || Spacewatch || — || align=right | 2.1 km || 
|-id=265 bgcolor=#E9E9E9
| 133265 ||  || — || September 16, 2003 || Kitt Peak || Spacewatch || — || align=right | 2.4 km || 
|-id=266 bgcolor=#E9E9E9
| 133266 ||  || — || September 16, 2003 || Kitt Peak || Spacewatch || — || align=right | 3.9 km || 
|-id=267 bgcolor=#E9E9E9
| 133267 ||  || — || September 16, 2003 || Palomar || NEAT || HOF || align=right | 5.0 km || 
|-id=268 bgcolor=#d6d6d6
| 133268 ||  || — || September 16, 2003 || Kitt Peak || Spacewatch || KOR || align=right | 2.8 km || 
|-id=269 bgcolor=#E9E9E9
| 133269 ||  || — || September 16, 2003 || Kitt Peak || Spacewatch || — || align=right | 3.6 km || 
|-id=270 bgcolor=#d6d6d6
| 133270 ||  || — || September 16, 2003 || Kitt Peak || Spacewatch || — || align=right | 3.8 km || 
|-id=271 bgcolor=#d6d6d6
| 133271 ||  || — || September 16, 2003 || Palomar || NEAT || — || align=right | 6.8 km || 
|-id=272 bgcolor=#fefefe
| 133272 ||  || — || September 17, 2003 || Kitt Peak || Spacewatch || — || align=right | 1.3 km || 
|-id=273 bgcolor=#fefefe
| 133273 ||  || — || September 16, 2003 || Kitt Peak || Spacewatch || MAS || align=right | 1.1 km || 
|-id=274 bgcolor=#d6d6d6
| 133274 ||  || — || September 16, 2003 || Kitt Peak || Spacewatch || — || align=right | 2.8 km || 
|-id=275 bgcolor=#d6d6d6
| 133275 ||  || — || September 17, 2003 || Kitt Peak || Spacewatch || KAR || align=right | 1.8 km || 
|-id=276 bgcolor=#fefefe
| 133276 ||  || — || September 17, 2003 || Kitt Peak || Spacewatch || — || align=right | 1.5 km || 
|-id=277 bgcolor=#fefefe
| 133277 ||  || — || September 17, 2003 || Kitt Peak || Spacewatch || NYS || align=right | 1.3 km || 
|-id=278 bgcolor=#d6d6d6
| 133278 ||  || — || September 17, 2003 || Kitt Peak || Spacewatch || — || align=right | 5.0 km || 
|-id=279 bgcolor=#d6d6d6
| 133279 ||  || — || September 18, 2003 || Campo Imperatore || CINEOS || — || align=right | 3.7 km || 
|-id=280 bgcolor=#d6d6d6
| 133280 Bryleen ||  ||  || September 18, 2003 || Wrightwood || J. W. Young || — || align=right | 2.9 km || 
|-id=281 bgcolor=#fefefe
| 133281 ||  || — || September 17, 2003 || Kitt Peak || Spacewatch || NYS || align=right | 1.2 km || 
|-id=282 bgcolor=#E9E9E9
| 133282 ||  || — || September 17, 2003 || Kitt Peak || Spacewatch || — || align=right | 3.6 km || 
|-id=283 bgcolor=#E9E9E9
| 133283 ||  || — || September 16, 2003 || Kitt Peak || Spacewatch || — || align=right | 1.5 km || 
|-id=284 bgcolor=#E9E9E9
| 133284 ||  || — || September 16, 2003 || Palomar || NEAT || GEF || align=right | 2.7 km || 
|-id=285 bgcolor=#E9E9E9
| 133285 ||  || — || September 17, 2003 || Kitt Peak || Spacewatch || — || align=right | 3.8 km || 
|-id=286 bgcolor=#E9E9E9
| 133286 ||  || — || September 17, 2003 || Haleakala || NEAT || — || align=right | 1.5 km || 
|-id=287 bgcolor=#fefefe
| 133287 ||  || — || September 17, 2003 || Haleakala || NEAT || MAS || align=right | 1.2 km || 
|-id=288 bgcolor=#E9E9E9
| 133288 ||  || — || September 18, 2003 || Socorro || LINEAR || AGN || align=right | 1.9 km || 
|-id=289 bgcolor=#E9E9E9
| 133289 ||  || — || September 18, 2003 || Palomar || NEAT || — || align=right | 4.5 km || 
|-id=290 bgcolor=#fefefe
| 133290 ||  || — || September 18, 2003 || Palomar || NEAT || — || align=right | 1.7 km || 
|-id=291 bgcolor=#E9E9E9
| 133291 ||  || — || September 18, 2003 || Palomar || NEAT || — || align=right | 3.2 km || 
|-id=292 bgcolor=#d6d6d6
| 133292 ||  || — || September 18, 2003 || Palomar || NEAT || — || align=right | 8.9 km || 
|-id=293 bgcolor=#d6d6d6
| 133293 Andrushivka ||  ||  || September 18, 2003 || Andrushivka || Andrushivka Obs. || — || align=right | 3.3 km || 
|-id=294 bgcolor=#fefefe
| 133294 ||  || — || September 18, 2003 || Socorro || LINEAR || V || align=right data-sort-value="0.85" | 850 m || 
|-id=295 bgcolor=#d6d6d6
| 133295 ||  || — || September 18, 2003 || Palomar || NEAT || — || align=right | 7.5 km || 
|-id=296 bgcolor=#E9E9E9
| 133296 Federicotosi ||  ||  || September 19, 2003 || Campo Imperatore || CINEOS || GAL || align=right | 3.0 km || 
|-id=297 bgcolor=#fefefe
| 133297 ||  || — || September 19, 2003 || Desert Eagle || W. K. Y. Yeung || FLO || align=right | 1.3 km || 
|-id=298 bgcolor=#E9E9E9
| 133298 ||  || — || September 16, 2003 || Palomar || NEAT || — || align=right | 1.9 km || 
|-id=299 bgcolor=#E9E9E9
| 133299 ||  || — || September 16, 2003 || Palomar || NEAT || — || align=right | 1.9 km || 
|-id=300 bgcolor=#fefefe
| 133300 ||  || — || September 16, 2003 || Palomar || NEAT || — || align=right | 1.5 km || 
|}

133301–133400 

|-bgcolor=#fefefe
| 133301 ||  || — || September 16, 2003 || Anderson Mesa || LONEOS || V || align=right | 1.4 km || 
|-id=302 bgcolor=#fefefe
| 133302 ||  || — || September 16, 2003 || Anderson Mesa || LONEOS || MAS || align=right | 1.5 km || 
|-id=303 bgcolor=#E9E9E9
| 133303 ||  || — || September 16, 2003 || Anderson Mesa || LONEOS || HOF || align=right | 5.0 km || 
|-id=304 bgcolor=#E9E9E9
| 133304 ||  || — || September 16, 2003 || Anderson Mesa || LONEOS || — || align=right | 4.4 km || 
|-id=305 bgcolor=#d6d6d6
| 133305 ||  || — || September 16, 2003 || Anderson Mesa || LONEOS || KOR || align=right | 2.9 km || 
|-id=306 bgcolor=#d6d6d6
| 133306 ||  || — || September 18, 2003 || Palomar || NEAT || — || align=right | 5.9 km || 
|-id=307 bgcolor=#d6d6d6
| 133307 ||  || — || September 18, 2003 || Palomar || NEAT || HYG || align=right | 5.2 km || 
|-id=308 bgcolor=#d6d6d6
| 133308 ||  || — || September 18, 2003 || Palomar || NEAT || — || align=right | 5.3 km || 
|-id=309 bgcolor=#E9E9E9
| 133309 ||  || — || September 16, 2003 || Kitt Peak || Spacewatch || — || align=right | 5.5 km || 
|-id=310 bgcolor=#d6d6d6
| 133310 ||  || — || September 16, 2003 || Kitt Peak || Spacewatch || EOS || align=right | 4.9 km || 
|-id=311 bgcolor=#d6d6d6
| 133311 ||  || — || September 16, 2003 || Kitt Peak || Spacewatch || KOR || align=right | 2.7 km || 
|-id=312 bgcolor=#fefefe
| 133312 ||  || — || September 18, 2003 || Socorro || LINEAR || NYS || align=right | 1.3 km || 
|-id=313 bgcolor=#d6d6d6
| 133313 ||  || — || September 17, 2003 || Kitt Peak || Spacewatch || KOR || align=right | 2.3 km || 
|-id=314 bgcolor=#E9E9E9
| 133314 ||  || — || September 18, 2003 || Kitt Peak || Spacewatch || GEF || align=right | 1.9 km || 
|-id=315 bgcolor=#E9E9E9
| 133315 ||  || — || September 18, 2003 || Kitt Peak || Spacewatch || — || align=right | 5.5 km || 
|-id=316 bgcolor=#d6d6d6
| 133316 ||  || — || September 19, 2003 || Kitt Peak || Spacewatch || — || align=right | 3.8 km || 
|-id=317 bgcolor=#E9E9E9
| 133317 ||  || — || September 17, 2003 || Kitt Peak || Spacewatch || — || align=right | 3.9 km || 
|-id=318 bgcolor=#fefefe
| 133318 ||  || — || September 21, 2003 || Anderson Mesa || LONEOS || — || align=right | 1.4 km || 
|-id=319 bgcolor=#d6d6d6
| 133319 ||  || — || September 17, 2003 || Socorro || LINEAR || — || align=right | 4.1 km || 
|-id=320 bgcolor=#d6d6d6
| 133320 ||  || — || September 17, 2003 || Socorro || LINEAR || — || align=right | 3.3 km || 
|-id=321 bgcolor=#E9E9E9
| 133321 ||  || — || September 18, 2003 || Campo Imperatore || CINEOS || — || align=right | 4.3 km || 
|-id=322 bgcolor=#d6d6d6
| 133322 ||  || — || September 18, 2003 || Campo Imperatore || CINEOS || KOR || align=right | 2.8 km || 
|-id=323 bgcolor=#E9E9E9
| 133323 ||  || — || September 18, 2003 || Campo Imperatore || CINEOS || — || align=right | 4.2 km || 
|-id=324 bgcolor=#d6d6d6
| 133324 ||  || — || September 18, 2003 || Socorro || LINEAR || 3:2 || align=right | 6.2 km || 
|-id=325 bgcolor=#E9E9E9
| 133325 ||  || — || September 18, 2003 || Palomar || NEAT || — || align=right | 3.2 km || 
|-id=326 bgcolor=#d6d6d6
| 133326 ||  || — || September 18, 2003 || Palomar || NEAT || KOR || align=right | 2.5 km || 
|-id=327 bgcolor=#d6d6d6
| 133327 ||  || — || September 18, 2003 || Kitt Peak || Spacewatch || HYG || align=right | 6.6 km || 
|-id=328 bgcolor=#E9E9E9
| 133328 ||  || — || September 18, 2003 || Kitt Peak || Spacewatch || — || align=right | 4.2 km || 
|-id=329 bgcolor=#E9E9E9
| 133329 ||  || — || September 18, 2003 || Palomar || NEAT || — || align=right | 2.7 km || 
|-id=330 bgcolor=#d6d6d6
| 133330 ||  || — || September 19, 2003 || Palomar || NEAT || — || align=right | 5.8 km || 
|-id=331 bgcolor=#fefefe
| 133331 ||  || — || September 19, 2003 || Palomar || NEAT || — || align=right | 1.2 km || 
|-id=332 bgcolor=#E9E9E9
| 133332 ||  || — || September 19, 2003 || Palomar || NEAT || — || align=right | 3.3 km || 
|-id=333 bgcolor=#d6d6d6
| 133333 ||  || — || September 19, 2003 || Socorro || LINEAR || — || align=right | 4.0 km || 
|-id=334 bgcolor=#E9E9E9
| 133334 ||  || — || September 19, 2003 || Kitt Peak || Spacewatch || GEF || align=right | 2.5 km || 
|-id=335 bgcolor=#E9E9E9
| 133335 ||  || — || September 19, 2003 || Haleakala || NEAT || — || align=right | 2.9 km || 
|-id=336 bgcolor=#E9E9E9
| 133336 ||  || — || September 20, 2003 || Socorro || LINEAR || — || align=right | 5.6 km || 
|-id=337 bgcolor=#d6d6d6
| 133337 ||  || — || September 20, 2003 || Socorro || LINEAR || — || align=right | 8.1 km || 
|-id=338 bgcolor=#E9E9E9
| 133338 ||  || — || September 20, 2003 || Socorro || LINEAR || — || align=right | 3.4 km || 
|-id=339 bgcolor=#d6d6d6
| 133339 ||  || — || September 20, 2003 || Haleakala || NEAT || — || align=right | 3.8 km || 
|-id=340 bgcolor=#fefefe
| 133340 ||  || — || September 20, 2003 || Palomar || NEAT || — || align=right | 1.4 km || 
|-id=341 bgcolor=#d6d6d6
| 133341 ||  || — || September 20, 2003 || Socorro || LINEAR || EUP || align=right | 7.2 km || 
|-id=342 bgcolor=#fefefe
| 133342 ||  || — || September 20, 2003 || Haleakala || NEAT || — || align=right | 1.1 km || 
|-id=343 bgcolor=#E9E9E9
| 133343 ||  || — || September 20, 2003 || Palomar || NEAT || — || align=right | 3.2 km || 
|-id=344 bgcolor=#E9E9E9
| 133344 ||  || — || September 20, 2003 || Palomar || NEAT || — || align=right | 3.4 km || 
|-id=345 bgcolor=#d6d6d6
| 133345 ||  || — || September 20, 2003 || Palomar || NEAT || — || align=right | 6.4 km || 
|-id=346 bgcolor=#E9E9E9
| 133346 ||  || — || September 20, 2003 || Palomar || NEAT || — || align=right | 3.3 km || 
|-id=347 bgcolor=#E9E9E9
| 133347 ||  || — || September 20, 2003 || Palomar || NEAT || — || align=right | 4.1 km || 
|-id=348 bgcolor=#E9E9E9
| 133348 ||  || — || September 20, 2003 || Palomar || NEAT || — || align=right | 5.5 km || 
|-id=349 bgcolor=#E9E9E9
| 133349 ||  || — || September 16, 2003 || Kitt Peak || Spacewatch || — || align=right | 4.4 km || 
|-id=350 bgcolor=#d6d6d6
| 133350 ||  || — || September 16, 2003 || Kitt Peak || Spacewatch || URS || align=right | 7.8 km || 
|-id=351 bgcolor=#E9E9E9
| 133351 ||  || — || September 18, 2003 || Socorro || LINEAR || — || align=right | 2.1 km || 
|-id=352 bgcolor=#d6d6d6
| 133352 ||  || — || September 18, 2003 || Goodricke-Pigott || R. A. Tucker || EOS || align=right | 4.7 km || 
|-id=353 bgcolor=#E9E9E9
| 133353 ||  || — || September 18, 2003 || Palomar || NEAT || — || align=right | 2.7 km || 
|-id=354 bgcolor=#E9E9E9
| 133354 ||  || — || September 18, 2003 || Črni Vrh || Črni Vrh || — || align=right | 4.1 km || 
|-id=355 bgcolor=#E9E9E9
| 133355 ||  || — || September 19, 2003 || Socorro || LINEAR || — || align=right | 4.4 km || 
|-id=356 bgcolor=#d6d6d6
| 133356 ||  || — || September 19, 2003 || Kitt Peak || Spacewatch || — || align=right | 6.9 km || 
|-id=357 bgcolor=#d6d6d6
| 133357 ||  || — || September 20, 2003 || Desert Eagle || W. K. Y. Yeung || — || align=right | 4.4 km || 
|-id=358 bgcolor=#E9E9E9
| 133358 ||  || — || September 20, 2003 || Socorro || LINEAR || — || align=right | 3.2 km || 
|-id=359 bgcolor=#d6d6d6
| 133359 ||  || — || September 20, 2003 || Socorro || LINEAR || — || align=right | 4.5 km || 
|-id=360 bgcolor=#E9E9E9
| 133360 ||  || — || September 20, 2003 || Črni Vrh || Črni Vrh || — || align=right | 4.6 km || 
|-id=361 bgcolor=#E9E9E9
| 133361 ||  || — || September 18, 2003 || Kitt Peak || Spacewatch || AGN || align=right | 1.7 km || 
|-id=362 bgcolor=#d6d6d6
| 133362 ||  || — || September 19, 2003 || Kitt Peak || Spacewatch || KOR || align=right | 1.9 km || 
|-id=363 bgcolor=#d6d6d6
| 133363 ||  || — || September 18, 2003 || Palomar || NEAT || — || align=right | 3.3 km || 
|-id=364 bgcolor=#E9E9E9
| 133364 ||  || — || September 19, 2003 || Campo Imperatore || CINEOS || — || align=right | 2.6 km || 
|-id=365 bgcolor=#fefefe
| 133365 ||  || — || September 18, 2003 || Campo Imperatore || CINEOS || — || align=right | 1.2 km || 
|-id=366 bgcolor=#E9E9E9
| 133366 ||  || — || September 19, 2003 || Palomar || NEAT || MIT || align=right | 4.3 km || 
|-id=367 bgcolor=#fefefe
| 133367 ||  || — || September 19, 2003 || Palomar || NEAT || — || align=right | 3.1 km || 
|-id=368 bgcolor=#d6d6d6
| 133368 ||  || — || September 20, 2003 || Socorro || LINEAR || — || align=right | 5.4 km || 
|-id=369 bgcolor=#E9E9E9
| 133369 ||  || — || September 20, 2003 || Socorro || LINEAR || — || align=right | 3.5 km || 
|-id=370 bgcolor=#fefefe
| 133370 ||  || — || September 20, 2003 || Socorro || LINEAR || NYS || align=right data-sort-value="0.87" | 870 m || 
|-id=371 bgcolor=#E9E9E9
| 133371 ||  || — || September 19, 2003 || Palomar || NEAT || KAZ || align=right | 3.1 km || 
|-id=372 bgcolor=#E9E9E9
| 133372 ||  || — || September 20, 2003 || Palomar || NEAT || — || align=right | 6.0 km || 
|-id=373 bgcolor=#E9E9E9
| 133373 ||  || — || September 20, 2003 || Palomar || NEAT || PAD || align=right | 6.5 km || 
|-id=374 bgcolor=#d6d6d6
| 133374 ||  || — || September 16, 2003 || Socorro || LINEAR || EOS || align=right | 4.1 km || 
|-id=375 bgcolor=#E9E9E9
| 133375 ||  || — || September 16, 2003 || Kitt Peak || Spacewatch || — || align=right | 2.8 km || 
|-id=376 bgcolor=#d6d6d6
| 133376 ||  || — || September 17, 2003 || Socorro || LINEAR || — || align=right | 4.2 km || 
|-id=377 bgcolor=#d6d6d6
| 133377 ||  || — || September 17, 2003 || Socorro || LINEAR || EOS || align=right | 4.1 km || 
|-id=378 bgcolor=#fefefe
| 133378 ||  || — || September 19, 2003 || Anderson Mesa || LONEOS || — || align=right | 1.4 km || 
|-id=379 bgcolor=#fefefe
| 133379 ||  || — || September 19, 2003 || Anderson Mesa || LONEOS || — || align=right | 1.7 km || 
|-id=380 bgcolor=#fefefe
| 133380 ||  || — || September 19, 2003 || Anderson Mesa || LONEOS || V || align=right | 1.1 km || 
|-id=381 bgcolor=#fefefe
| 133381 ||  || — || September 19, 2003 || Anderson Mesa || LONEOS || — || align=right | 2.7 km || 
|-id=382 bgcolor=#d6d6d6
| 133382 ||  || — || September 19, 2003 || Anderson Mesa || LONEOS || ALA || align=right | 6.4 km || 
|-id=383 bgcolor=#d6d6d6
| 133383 ||  || — || September 19, 2003 || Anderson Mesa || LONEOS || — || align=right | 5.7 km || 
|-id=384 bgcolor=#fefefe
| 133384 ||  || — || September 19, 2003 || Anderson Mesa || LONEOS || — || align=right | 1.3 km || 
|-id=385 bgcolor=#E9E9E9
| 133385 ||  || — || September 19, 2003 || Anderson Mesa || LONEOS || — || align=right | 2.6 km || 
|-id=386 bgcolor=#d6d6d6
| 133386 ||  || — || September 19, 2003 || Anderson Mesa || LONEOS || THM || align=right | 3.5 km || 
|-id=387 bgcolor=#fefefe
| 133387 ||  || — || September 19, 2003 || Anderson Mesa || LONEOS || MAS || align=right | 1.2 km || 
|-id=388 bgcolor=#E9E9E9
| 133388 ||  || — || September 22, 2003 || Kitt Peak || Spacewatch || EUN || align=right | 2.6 km || 
|-id=389 bgcolor=#E9E9E9
| 133389 ||  || — || September 20, 2003 || Socorro || LINEAR || MARfast? || align=right | 2.0 km || 
|-id=390 bgcolor=#E9E9E9
| 133390 ||  || — || September 22, 2003 || Kitt Peak || Spacewatch || GEF || align=right | 2.3 km || 
|-id=391 bgcolor=#E9E9E9
| 133391 ||  || — || September 18, 2003 || Kitt Peak || Spacewatch || — || align=right | 2.4 km || 
|-id=392 bgcolor=#E9E9E9
| 133392 ||  || — || September 19, 2003 || Kitt Peak || Spacewatch || — || align=right | 2.2 km || 
|-id=393 bgcolor=#fefefe
| 133393 ||  || — || September 19, 2003 || Socorro || LINEAR || — || align=right | 1.8 km || 
|-id=394 bgcolor=#d6d6d6
| 133394 ||  || — || September 19, 2003 || Kitt Peak || Spacewatch || — || align=right | 3.9 km || 
|-id=395 bgcolor=#d6d6d6
| 133395 ||  || — || September 19, 2003 || Kitt Peak || Spacewatch || KOR || align=right | 2.3 km || 
|-id=396 bgcolor=#E9E9E9
| 133396 ||  || — || September 19, 2003 || Kitt Peak || Spacewatch || — || align=right | 4.6 km || 
|-id=397 bgcolor=#d6d6d6
| 133397 ||  || — || September 20, 2003 || Anderson Mesa || LONEOS || — || align=right | 3.2 km || 
|-id=398 bgcolor=#E9E9E9
| 133398 ||  || — || September 20, 2003 || Anderson Mesa || LONEOS || WIT || align=right | 1.8 km || 
|-id=399 bgcolor=#d6d6d6
| 133399 ||  || — || September 20, 2003 || Anderson Mesa || LONEOS || — || align=right | 4.8 km || 
|-id=400 bgcolor=#E9E9E9
| 133400 ||  || — || September 22, 2003 || Kitt Peak || Spacewatch || — || align=right | 4.2 km || 
|}

133401–133500 

|-bgcolor=#E9E9E9
| 133401 ||  || — || September 23, 2003 || Haleakala || NEAT || EUN || align=right | 2.0 km || 
|-id=402 bgcolor=#d6d6d6
| 133402 ||  || — || September 23, 2003 || Haleakala || NEAT || SYL7:4 || align=right | 7.9 km || 
|-id=403 bgcolor=#E9E9E9
| 133403 ||  || — || September 23, 2003 || Haleakala || NEAT || — || align=right | 2.5 km || 
|-id=404 bgcolor=#d6d6d6
| 133404 Morogues ||  ||  || September 23, 2003 || Saint-Sulpice || B. Christophe || — || align=right | 4.2 km || 
|-id=405 bgcolor=#E9E9E9
| 133405 ||  || — || September 18, 2003 || Campo Imperatore || CINEOS || — || align=right | 4.3 km || 
|-id=406 bgcolor=#E9E9E9
| 133406 ||  || — || September 18, 2003 || Kitt Peak || Spacewatch || — || align=right | 3.6 km || 
|-id=407 bgcolor=#E9E9E9
| 133407 ||  || — || September 18, 2003 || Socorro || LINEAR || — || align=right | 4.0 km || 
|-id=408 bgcolor=#d6d6d6
| 133408 ||  || — || September 18, 2003 || Palomar || NEAT || — || align=right | 4.7 km || 
|-id=409 bgcolor=#d6d6d6
| 133409 ||  || — || September 18, 2003 || Kitt Peak || Spacewatch || — || align=right | 4.6 km || 
|-id=410 bgcolor=#E9E9E9
| 133410 ||  || — || September 18, 2003 || Palomar || NEAT || — || align=right | 2.4 km || 
|-id=411 bgcolor=#d6d6d6
| 133411 ||  || — || September 18, 2003 || Palomar || NEAT || — || align=right | 3.8 km || 
|-id=412 bgcolor=#d6d6d6
| 133412 ||  || — || September 18, 2003 || Palomar || NEAT || KOR || align=right | 2.6 km || 
|-id=413 bgcolor=#E9E9E9
| 133413 ||  || — || September 19, 2003 || Kitt Peak || Spacewatch || — || align=right | 3.9 km || 
|-id=414 bgcolor=#fefefe
| 133414 ||  || — || September 19, 2003 || Haleakala || NEAT || MAS || align=right | 1.0 km || 
|-id=415 bgcolor=#d6d6d6
| 133415 ||  || — || September 20, 2003 || Socorro || LINEAR || — || align=right | 6.7 km || 
|-id=416 bgcolor=#E9E9E9
| 133416 ||  || — || September 20, 2003 || Socorro || LINEAR || — || align=right | 4.0 km || 
|-id=417 bgcolor=#d6d6d6
| 133417 ||  || — || September 21, 2003 || Kitt Peak || Spacewatch || — || align=right | 5.0 km || 
|-id=418 bgcolor=#fefefe
| 133418 ||  || — || September 22, 2003 || Anderson Mesa || LONEOS || — || align=right | 1.3 km || 
|-id=419 bgcolor=#d6d6d6
| 133419 ||  || — || September 22, 2003 || Anderson Mesa || LONEOS || KOR || align=right | 2.8 km || 
|-id=420 bgcolor=#d6d6d6
| 133420 ||  || — || September 23, 2003 || Palomar || NEAT || — || align=right | 5.7 km || 
|-id=421 bgcolor=#d6d6d6
| 133421 ||  || — || September 22, 2003 || Desert Eagle || W. K. Y. Yeung || — || align=right | 4.2 km || 
|-id=422 bgcolor=#d6d6d6
| 133422 ||  || — || September 22, 2003 || Desert Eagle || W. K. Y. Yeung || — || align=right | 4.7 km || 
|-id=423 bgcolor=#d6d6d6
| 133423 ||  || — || September 17, 2003 || Kitt Peak || Spacewatch || — || align=right | 4.5 km || 
|-id=424 bgcolor=#d6d6d6
| 133424 ||  || — || September 20, 2003 || Campo Imperatore || CINEOS || — || align=right | 4.1 km || 
|-id=425 bgcolor=#E9E9E9
| 133425 ||  || — || September 20, 2003 || Haleakala || NEAT || INO || align=right | 2.6 km || 
|-id=426 bgcolor=#d6d6d6
| 133426 ||  || — || September 20, 2003 || Palomar || NEAT || — || align=right | 3.1 km || 
|-id=427 bgcolor=#d6d6d6
| 133427 ||  || — || September 20, 2003 || Palomar || NEAT || — || align=right | 5.6 km || 
|-id=428 bgcolor=#d6d6d6
| 133428 ||  || — || September 21, 2003 || Anderson Mesa || LONEOS || 7:4 || align=right | 8.2 km || 
|-id=429 bgcolor=#d6d6d6
| 133429 ||  || — || September 21, 2003 || Anderson Mesa || LONEOS || — || align=right | 6.3 km || 
|-id=430 bgcolor=#d6d6d6
| 133430 ||  || — || September 21, 2003 || Anderson Mesa || LONEOS || — || align=right | 6.5 km || 
|-id=431 bgcolor=#E9E9E9
| 133431 ||  || — || September 23, 2003 || Uccle || T. Pauwels || — || align=right | 3.1 km || 
|-id=432 bgcolor=#d6d6d6
| 133432 Sarahnoble ||  ||  || September 22, 2003 || Goodricke-Pigott || V. Reddy || — || align=right | 5.4 km || 
|-id=433 bgcolor=#d6d6d6
| 133433 ||  || — || September 22, 2003 || Anderson Mesa || LONEOS || — || align=right | 3.3 km || 
|-id=434 bgcolor=#d6d6d6
| 133434 ||  || — || September 22, 2003 || Palomar || NEAT || KOR || align=right | 2.4 km || 
|-id=435 bgcolor=#d6d6d6
| 133435 ||  || — || September 22, 2003 || Kitt Peak || Spacewatch || — || align=right | 4.0 km || 
|-id=436 bgcolor=#d6d6d6
| 133436 ||  || — || September 25, 2003 || Haleakala || NEAT || — || align=right | 6.0 km || 
|-id=437 bgcolor=#E9E9E9
| 133437 ||  || — || September 26, 2003 || Socorro || LINEAR || — || align=right | 3.6 km || 
|-id=438 bgcolor=#d6d6d6
| 133438 ||  || — || September 26, 2003 || Socorro || LINEAR || — || align=right | 5.4 km || 
|-id=439 bgcolor=#E9E9E9
| 133439 ||  || — || September 26, 2003 || Palomar || NEAT || EUN || align=right | 2.6 km || 
|-id=440 bgcolor=#fefefe
| 133440 ||  || — || September 26, 2003 || Socorro || LINEAR || NYS || align=right | 3.0 km || 
|-id=441 bgcolor=#E9E9E9
| 133441 ||  || — || September 26, 2003 || Socorro || LINEAR || HOF || align=right | 5.4 km || 
|-id=442 bgcolor=#d6d6d6
| 133442 ||  || — || September 26, 2003 || Socorro || LINEAR || — || align=right | 4.7 km || 
|-id=443 bgcolor=#d6d6d6
| 133443 ||  || — || September 26, 2003 || Socorro || LINEAR || — || align=right | 4.1 km || 
|-id=444 bgcolor=#d6d6d6
| 133444 ||  || — || September 27, 2003 || Desert Eagle || W. K. Y. Yeung || — || align=right | 7.4 km || 
|-id=445 bgcolor=#E9E9E9
| 133445 ||  || — || September 28, 2003 || Desert Eagle || W. K. Y. Yeung || — || align=right | 3.1 km || 
|-id=446 bgcolor=#d6d6d6
| 133446 ||  || — || September 29, 2003 || Desert Eagle || W. K. Y. Yeung || — || align=right | 3.9 km || 
|-id=447 bgcolor=#d6d6d6
| 133447 ||  || — || September 29, 2003 || Desert Eagle || W. K. Y. Yeung || — || align=right | 5.0 km || 
|-id=448 bgcolor=#d6d6d6
| 133448 ||  || — || September 27, 2003 || Desert Eagle || W. K. Y. Yeung || THM || align=right | 2.9 km || 
|-id=449 bgcolor=#d6d6d6
| 133449 ||  || — || September 28, 2003 || Desert Eagle || W. K. Y. Yeung || KOR || align=right | 2.9 km || 
|-id=450 bgcolor=#d6d6d6
| 133450 ||  || — || September 29, 2003 || Desert Eagle || W. K. Y. Yeung || — || align=right | 4.5 km || 
|-id=451 bgcolor=#E9E9E9
| 133451 ||  || — || September 29, 2003 || Desert Eagle || W. K. Y. Yeung || — || align=right | 3.0 km || 
|-id=452 bgcolor=#E9E9E9
| 133452 ||  || — || September 25, 2003 || Bergisch Gladbach || W. Bickel || — || align=right | 3.9 km || 
|-id=453 bgcolor=#E9E9E9
| 133453 ||  || — || September 26, 2003 || Socorro || LINEAR || AGN || align=right | 2.7 km || 
|-id=454 bgcolor=#E9E9E9
| 133454 ||  || — || September 26, 2003 || Desert Eagle || W. K. Y. Yeung || AGN || align=right | 2.2 km || 
|-id=455 bgcolor=#d6d6d6
| 133455 ||  || — || September 26, 2003 || Socorro || LINEAR || URS || align=right | 7.6 km || 
|-id=456 bgcolor=#fefefe
| 133456 ||  || — || September 27, 2003 || Socorro || LINEAR || NYS || align=right | 1.0 km || 
|-id=457 bgcolor=#d6d6d6
| 133457 ||  || — || September 27, 2003 || Kitt Peak || Spacewatch || — || align=right | 6.1 km || 
|-id=458 bgcolor=#d6d6d6
| 133458 ||  || — || September 27, 2003 || Kitt Peak || Spacewatch || EOS || align=right | 3.4 km || 
|-id=459 bgcolor=#E9E9E9
| 133459 ||  || — || September 24, 2003 || Palomar || NEAT || — || align=right | 3.8 km || 
|-id=460 bgcolor=#E9E9E9
| 133460 ||  || — || September 24, 2003 || Palomar || NEAT || MAR || align=right | 1.8 km || 
|-id=461 bgcolor=#E9E9E9
| 133461 ||  || — || September 24, 2003 || Palomar || NEAT || — || align=right | 1.5 km || 
|-id=462 bgcolor=#E9E9E9
| 133462 ||  || — || September 25, 2003 || Palomar || NEAT || — || align=right | 2.5 km || 
|-id=463 bgcolor=#d6d6d6
| 133463 ||  || — || September 27, 2003 || Kitt Peak || Spacewatch || — || align=right | 4.3 km || 
|-id=464 bgcolor=#fefefe
| 133464 ||  || — || September 27, 2003 || Socorro || LINEAR || — || align=right | 1.7 km || 
|-id=465 bgcolor=#E9E9E9
| 133465 ||  || — || September 27, 2003 || Socorro || LINEAR || — || align=right | 2.0 km || 
|-id=466 bgcolor=#d6d6d6
| 133466 ||  || — || September 27, 2003 || Socorro || LINEAR || — || align=right | 5.0 km || 
|-id=467 bgcolor=#d6d6d6
| 133467 ||  || — || September 27, 2003 || Kitt Peak || Spacewatch || THM || align=right | 3.1 km || 
|-id=468 bgcolor=#E9E9E9
| 133468 ||  || — || September 26, 2003 || Socorro || LINEAR || HEN || align=right | 1.9 km || 
|-id=469 bgcolor=#d6d6d6
| 133469 ||  || — || September 26, 2003 || Socorro || LINEAR || THM || align=right | 4.9 km || 
|-id=470 bgcolor=#fefefe
| 133470 ||  || — || September 26, 2003 || Socorro || LINEAR || NYS || align=right data-sort-value="0.98" | 980 m || 
|-id=471 bgcolor=#fefefe
| 133471 ||  || — || September 26, 2003 || Socorro || LINEAR || — || align=right | 2.7 km || 
|-id=472 bgcolor=#E9E9E9
| 133472 ||  || — || September 26, 2003 || Socorro || LINEAR || — || align=right | 4.2 km || 
|-id=473 bgcolor=#d6d6d6
| 133473 ||  || — || September 26, 2003 || Socorro || LINEAR || — || align=right | 4.7 km || 
|-id=474 bgcolor=#E9E9E9
| 133474 ||  || — || September 26, 2003 || Socorro || LINEAR || AGN || align=right | 2.1 km || 
|-id=475 bgcolor=#d6d6d6
| 133475 ||  || — || September 26, 2003 || Socorro || LINEAR || — || align=right | 4.8 km || 
|-id=476 bgcolor=#E9E9E9
| 133476 ||  || — || September 26, 2003 || Socorro || LINEAR || — || align=right | 2.2 km || 
|-id=477 bgcolor=#d6d6d6
| 133477 ||  || — || September 27, 2003 || Kitt Peak || Spacewatch || EOS || align=right | 2.7 km || 
|-id=478 bgcolor=#d6d6d6
| 133478 ||  || — || September 27, 2003 || Kitt Peak || Spacewatch || KAR || align=right | 1.7 km || 
|-id=479 bgcolor=#d6d6d6
| 133479 ||  || — || September 27, 2003 || Kitt Peak || Spacewatch || CHA || align=right | 3.0 km || 
|-id=480 bgcolor=#d6d6d6
| 133480 ||  || — || September 27, 2003 || Kitt Peak || Spacewatch || — || align=right | 7.6 km || 
|-id=481 bgcolor=#d6d6d6
| 133481 ||  || — || September 28, 2003 || Kitt Peak || Spacewatch || — || align=right | 4.7 km || 
|-id=482 bgcolor=#d6d6d6
| 133482 ||  || — || September 28, 2003 || Socorro || LINEAR || — || align=right | 4.7 km || 
|-id=483 bgcolor=#fefefe
| 133483 ||  || — || September 28, 2003 || Socorro || LINEAR || NYS || align=right | 3.0 km || 
|-id=484 bgcolor=#E9E9E9
| 133484 ||  || — || September 28, 2003 || Kitt Peak || Spacewatch || — || align=right | 4.6 km || 
|-id=485 bgcolor=#fefefe
| 133485 ||  || — || September 28, 2003 || Socorro || LINEAR || NYS || align=right | 1.1 km || 
|-id=486 bgcolor=#d6d6d6
| 133486 ||  || — || September 29, 2003 || Socorro || LINEAR || — || align=right | 3.4 km || 
|-id=487 bgcolor=#E9E9E9
| 133487 ||  || — || September 29, 2003 || Socorro || LINEAR || — || align=right | 3.4 km || 
|-id=488 bgcolor=#d6d6d6
| 133488 ||  || — || September 29, 2003 || Socorro || LINEAR || KOR || align=right | 2.5 km || 
|-id=489 bgcolor=#E9E9E9
| 133489 ||  || — || September 29, 2003 || Kitt Peak || Spacewatch || — || align=right | 3.7 km || 
|-id=490 bgcolor=#E9E9E9
| 133490 ||  || — || September 26, 2003 || Socorro || LINEAR || GAL || align=right | 3.2 km || 
|-id=491 bgcolor=#fefefe
| 133491 ||  || — || September 27, 2003 || Socorro || LINEAR || FLO || align=right | 1.9 km || 
|-id=492 bgcolor=#E9E9E9
| 133492 ||  || — || September 27, 2003 || Socorro || LINEAR || — || align=right | 7.3 km || 
|-id=493 bgcolor=#E9E9E9
| 133493 ||  || — || September 28, 2003 || Kitt Peak || Spacewatch || AGN || align=right | 1.9 km || 
|-id=494 bgcolor=#E9E9E9
| 133494 ||  || — || September 29, 2003 || Socorro || LINEAR || — || align=right | 1.7 km || 
|-id=495 bgcolor=#E9E9E9
| 133495 ||  || — || September 29, 2003 || Socorro || LINEAR || — || align=right | 3.9 km || 
|-id=496 bgcolor=#d6d6d6
| 133496 ||  || — || September 30, 2003 || Socorro || LINEAR || — || align=right | 6.1 km || 
|-id=497 bgcolor=#d6d6d6
| 133497 ||  || — || September 18, 2003 || Palomar || NEAT || — || align=right | 6.7 km || 
|-id=498 bgcolor=#E9E9E9
| 133498 ||  || — || September 18, 2003 || Socorro || LINEAR || — || align=right | 4.2 km || 
|-id=499 bgcolor=#E9E9E9
| 133499 ||  || — || September 19, 2003 || Anderson Mesa || LONEOS || — || align=right | 3.8 km || 
|-id=500 bgcolor=#fefefe
| 133500 ||  || — || September 19, 2003 || Anderson Mesa || LONEOS || MAS || align=right | 1.2 km || 
|}

133501–133600 

|-bgcolor=#E9E9E9
| 133501 ||  || — || September 19, 2003 || Palomar || NEAT || GEF || align=right | 2.3 km || 
|-id=502 bgcolor=#E9E9E9
| 133502 ||  || — || September 20, 2003 || Socorro || LINEAR || — || align=right | 5.2 km || 
|-id=503 bgcolor=#fefefe
| 133503 ||  || — || September 28, 2003 || Socorro || LINEAR || ERI || align=right | 3.0 km || 
|-id=504 bgcolor=#d6d6d6
| 133504 ||  || — || September 28, 2003 || Anderson Mesa || LONEOS || — || align=right | 2.9 km || 
|-id=505 bgcolor=#d6d6d6
| 133505 ||  || — || September 28, 2003 || Kitt Peak || Spacewatch || HYG || align=right | 3.1 km || 
|-id=506 bgcolor=#E9E9E9
| 133506 ||  || — || September 27, 2003 || Socorro || LINEAR || — || align=right | 2.4 km || 
|-id=507 bgcolor=#d6d6d6
| 133507 ||  || — || September 28, 2003 || Socorro || LINEAR || BRA || align=right | 2.3 km || 
|-id=508 bgcolor=#E9E9E9
| 133508 ||  || — || September 28, 2003 || Socorro || LINEAR || — || align=right | 2.2 km || 
|-id=509 bgcolor=#E9E9E9
| 133509 ||  || — || September 28, 2003 || Socorro || LINEAR || — || align=right | 4.3 km || 
|-id=510 bgcolor=#d6d6d6
| 133510 ||  || — || September 18, 2003 || Haleakala || NEAT || — || align=right | 3.9 km || 
|-id=511 bgcolor=#fefefe
| 133511 ||  || — || September 18, 2003 || Haleakala || NEAT || NYS || align=right | 1.3 km || 
|-id=512 bgcolor=#E9E9E9
| 133512 ||  || — || September 29, 2003 || Anderson Mesa || LONEOS || — || align=right | 3.2 km || 
|-id=513 bgcolor=#E9E9E9
| 133513 ||  || — || September 16, 2003 || Kitt Peak || Spacewatch || — || align=right | 4.2 km || 
|-id=514 bgcolor=#E9E9E9
| 133514 ||  || — || September 17, 2003 || Palomar || NEAT || BRG || align=right | 3.3 km || 
|-id=515 bgcolor=#fefefe
| 133515 ||  || — || September 17, 2003 || Palomar || NEAT || MAS || align=right | 1.0 km || 
|-id=516 bgcolor=#d6d6d6
| 133516 ||  || — || September 17, 2003 || Palomar || NEAT || — || align=right | 3.4 km || 
|-id=517 bgcolor=#d6d6d6
| 133517 ||  || — || September 17, 2003 || Palomar || NEAT || — || align=right | 5.9 km || 
|-id=518 bgcolor=#d6d6d6
| 133518 ||  || — || September 30, 2003 || Socorro || LINEAR || — || align=right | 5.3 km || 
|-id=519 bgcolor=#E9E9E9
| 133519 ||  || — || September 30, 2003 || Socorro || LINEAR || JUN || align=right | 2.5 km || 
|-id=520 bgcolor=#E9E9E9
| 133520 ||  || — || September 29, 2003 || Anderson Mesa || LONEOS || — || align=right | 5.4 km || 
|-id=521 bgcolor=#fefefe
| 133521 ||  || — || September 28, 2003 || Socorro || LINEAR || — || align=right | 1.4 km || 
|-id=522 bgcolor=#E9E9E9
| 133522 ||  || — || September 29, 2003 || Socorro || LINEAR || — || align=right | 2.4 km || 
|-id=523 bgcolor=#d6d6d6
| 133523 ||  || — || September 29, 2003 || Socorro || LINEAR || — || align=right | 3.1 km || 
|-id=524 bgcolor=#d6d6d6
| 133524 ||  || — || September 29, 2003 || Socorro || LINEAR || — || align=right | 6.4 km || 
|-id=525 bgcolor=#E9E9E9
| 133525 ||  || — || September 16, 2003 || Socorro || LINEAR || — || align=right | 3.8 km || 
|-id=526 bgcolor=#E9E9E9
| 133526 ||  || — || September 25, 2003 || Palomar || NEAT || — || align=right | 3.3 km || 
|-id=527 bgcolor=#d6d6d6
| 133527 Fredearly || 2003 TZ ||  || October 5, 2003 || Wrightwood || J. W. Young || — || align=right | 3.8 km || 
|-id=528 bgcolor=#d6d6d6
| 133528 Ceragioli ||  ||  || October 4, 2003 || Junk Bond || D. Healy || KOR || align=right | 2.6 km || 
|-id=529 bgcolor=#d6d6d6
| 133529 ||  || — || October 3, 2003 || Haleakala || NEAT || — || align=right | 4.2 km || 
|-id=530 bgcolor=#E9E9E9
| 133530 ||  || — || October 2, 2003 || Kitt Peak || Spacewatch || — || align=right | 1.7 km || 
|-id=531 bgcolor=#FA8072
| 133531 ||  || — || October 2, 2003 || Haleakala || NEAT || PHO || align=right | 1.4 km || 
|-id=532 bgcolor=#E9E9E9
| 133532 ||  || — || October 1, 2003 || Anderson Mesa || LONEOS || — || align=right | 4.0 km || 
|-id=533 bgcolor=#fefefe
| 133533 ||  || — || October 2, 2003 || Haleakala || NEAT || — || align=right | 1.7 km || 
|-id=534 bgcolor=#E9E9E9
| 133534 ||  || — || October 4, 2003 || Kitt Peak || Spacewatch || — || align=right | 4.5 km || 
|-id=535 bgcolor=#d6d6d6
| 133535 ||  || — || October 4, 2003 || Kitt Peak || Spacewatch || EOS || align=right | 4.1 km || 
|-id=536 bgcolor=#E9E9E9
| 133536 Alicewhagel ||  ||  || October 15, 2003 || Sandlot || Sandlot Obs. || — || align=right | 4.4 km || 
|-id=537 bgcolor=#fefefe
| 133537 Mariomotta ||  ||  || October 7, 2003 || Schiaparelli || L. Buzzi || — || align=right | 2.2 km || 
|-id=538 bgcolor=#d6d6d6
| 133538 ||  || — || October 15, 2003 || Palomar || NEAT || — || align=right | 4.4 km || 
|-id=539 bgcolor=#fefefe
| 133539 ||  || — || October 14, 2003 || Anderson Mesa || LONEOS || FLO || align=right | 2.6 km || 
|-id=540 bgcolor=#E9E9E9
| 133540 ||  || — || October 14, 2003 || Anderson Mesa || LONEOS || HEN || align=right | 2.4 km || 
|-id=541 bgcolor=#fefefe
| 133541 ||  || — || October 3, 2003 || Kitt Peak || Spacewatch || PHO || align=right | 1.4 km || 
|-id=542 bgcolor=#E9E9E9
| 133542 ||  || — || October 14, 2003 || Anderson Mesa || LONEOS || — || align=right | 2.7 km || 
|-id=543 bgcolor=#d6d6d6
| 133543 ||  || — || October 15, 2003 || Anderson Mesa || LONEOS || — || align=right | 6.4 km || 
|-id=544 bgcolor=#fefefe
| 133544 ||  || — || October 15, 2003 || Anderson Mesa || LONEOS || — || align=right | 1.4 km || 
|-id=545 bgcolor=#d6d6d6
| 133545 ||  || — || October 14, 2003 || Anderson Mesa || LONEOS || — || align=right | 8.8 km || 
|-id=546 bgcolor=#fefefe
| 133546 ||  || — || October 15, 2003 || Anderson Mesa || LONEOS || — || align=right | 1.4 km || 
|-id=547 bgcolor=#fefefe
| 133547 ||  || — || October 15, 2003 || Anderson Mesa || LONEOS || NYS || align=right | 1.3 km || 
|-id=548 bgcolor=#d6d6d6
| 133548 ||  || — || October 15, 2003 || Palomar || NEAT || KOR || align=right | 2.3 km || 
|-id=549 bgcolor=#d6d6d6
| 133549 ||  || — || October 1, 2003 || Anderson Mesa || LONEOS || URS || align=right | 8.6 km || 
|-id=550 bgcolor=#fefefe
| 133550 ||  || — || October 3, 2003 || Haleakala || NEAT || — || align=right | 1.6 km || 
|-id=551 bgcolor=#E9E9E9
| 133551 ||  || — || October 15, 2003 || Anderson Mesa || LONEOS || AGN || align=right | 1.9 km || 
|-id=552 bgcolor=#d6d6d6
| 133552 Itting-Enke ||  ||  || October 16, 2003 || Mülheim-Ruhr || Turtle Star Obs. || — || align=right | 6.0 km || 
|-id=553 bgcolor=#E9E9E9
| 133553 ||  || — || October 16, 2003 || Kitt Peak || Spacewatch || — || align=right | 3.1 km || 
|-id=554 bgcolor=#FA8072
| 133554 ||  || — || October 18, 2003 || Socorro || LINEAR || — || align=right | 2.1 km || 
|-id=555 bgcolor=#d6d6d6
| 133555 ||  || — || October 16, 2003 || Anderson Mesa || LONEOS || — || align=right | 3.9 km || 
|-id=556 bgcolor=#E9E9E9
| 133556 ||  || — || October 18, 2003 || Palomar || NEAT || — || align=right | 7.6 km || 
|-id=557 bgcolor=#E9E9E9
| 133557 ||  || — || October 18, 2003 || Palomar || NEAT || ADE || align=right | 5.8 km || 
|-id=558 bgcolor=#E9E9E9
| 133558 ||  || — || October 16, 2003 || Kingsnake || J. V. McClusky || BRU || align=right | 5.4 km || 
|-id=559 bgcolor=#d6d6d6
| 133559 ||  || — || October 16, 2003 || Anderson Mesa || LONEOS || 3:2 || align=right | 5.5 km || 
|-id=560 bgcolor=#d6d6d6
| 133560 ||  || — || October 16, 2003 || Anderson Mesa || LONEOS || EOS || align=right | 3.4 km || 
|-id=561 bgcolor=#d6d6d6
| 133561 ||  || — || October 21, 2003 || Socorro || LINEAR || EOS || align=right | 3.4 km || 
|-id=562 bgcolor=#d6d6d6
| 133562 ||  || — || October 21, 2003 || Kitt Peak || Spacewatch || — || align=right | 3.8 km || 
|-id=563 bgcolor=#E9E9E9
| 133563 ||  || — || October 22, 2003 || Kitt Peak || Spacewatch || HEN || align=right | 1.8 km || 
|-id=564 bgcolor=#d6d6d6
| 133564 ||  || — || October 25, 2003 || Goodricke-Pigott || R. A. Tucker || 7:4 || align=right | 13 km || 
|-id=565 bgcolor=#E9E9E9
| 133565 ||  || — || October 23, 2003 || Goodricke-Pigott || R. A. Tucker || — || align=right | 4.5 km || 
|-id=566 bgcolor=#C2FFFF
| 133566 ||  || — || October 26, 2003 || Kitt Peak || Spacewatch || L5 || align=right | 19 km || 
|-id=567 bgcolor=#d6d6d6
| 133567 ||  || — || October 21, 2003 || Nashville || R. Clingan || KOR || align=right | 2.2 km || 
|-id=568 bgcolor=#E9E9E9
| 133568 ||  || — || October 16, 2003 || Palomar || NEAT || EUN || align=right | 2.5 km || 
|-id=569 bgcolor=#d6d6d6
| 133569 ||  || — || October 16, 2003 || Palomar || NEAT || — || align=right | 4.4 km || 
|-id=570 bgcolor=#d6d6d6
| 133570 ||  || — || October 16, 2003 || Črni Vrh || Črni Vrh || — || align=right | 6.8 km || 
|-id=571 bgcolor=#E9E9E9
| 133571 ||  || — || October 17, 2003 || Kitt Peak || Spacewatch || — || align=right | 1.9 km || 
|-id=572 bgcolor=#E9E9E9
| 133572 ||  || — || October 17, 2003 || Kitt Peak || Spacewatch || MAR || align=right | 2.2 km || 
|-id=573 bgcolor=#d6d6d6
| 133573 ||  || — || October 16, 2003 || Kitt Peak || Spacewatch || — || align=right | 6.0 km || 
|-id=574 bgcolor=#d6d6d6
| 133574 ||  || — || October 16, 2003 || Anderson Mesa || LONEOS || HYG || align=right | 6.6 km || 
|-id=575 bgcolor=#E9E9E9
| 133575 ||  || — || October 16, 2003 || Anderson Mesa || LONEOS || — || align=right | 1.8 km || 
|-id=576 bgcolor=#d6d6d6
| 133576 ||  || — || October 16, 2003 || Anderson Mesa || LONEOS || THM || align=right | 4.8 km || 
|-id=577 bgcolor=#FA8072
| 133577 ||  || — || October 16, 2003 || Haleakala || NEAT || — || align=right | 1.6 km || 
|-id=578 bgcolor=#fefefe
| 133578 ||  || — || October 18, 2003 || Palomar || NEAT || — || align=right | 1.5 km || 
|-id=579 bgcolor=#E9E9E9
| 133579 ||  || — || October 18, 2003 || Palomar || NEAT || — || align=right | 3.3 km || 
|-id=580 bgcolor=#E9E9E9
| 133580 ||  || — || October 18, 2003 || Palomar || NEAT || — || align=right | 3.8 km || 
|-id=581 bgcolor=#E9E9E9
| 133581 ||  || — || October 18, 2003 || Palomar || NEAT || EUN || align=right | 3.2 km || 
|-id=582 bgcolor=#E9E9E9
| 133582 ||  || — || October 17, 2003 || Anderson Mesa || LONEOS || — || align=right | 2.9 km || 
|-id=583 bgcolor=#fefefe
| 133583 ||  || — || October 17, 2003 || Anderson Mesa || LONEOS || V || align=right | 1.1 km || 
|-id=584 bgcolor=#E9E9E9
| 133584 ||  || — || October 16, 2003 || Palomar || NEAT || MAR || align=right | 2.0 km || 
|-id=585 bgcolor=#d6d6d6
| 133585 ||  || — || October 16, 2003 || Palomar || NEAT || — || align=right | 4.2 km || 
|-id=586 bgcolor=#fefefe
| 133586 ||  || — || October 16, 2003 || Anderson Mesa || LONEOS || — || align=right | 1.8 km || 
|-id=587 bgcolor=#fefefe
| 133587 ||  || — || October 16, 2003 || Palomar || NEAT || V || align=right | 1.1 km || 
|-id=588 bgcolor=#E9E9E9
| 133588 ||  || — || October 16, 2003 || Palomar || NEAT || GAL || align=right | 3.1 km || 
|-id=589 bgcolor=#d6d6d6
| 133589 ||  || — || October 16, 2003 || Palomar || NEAT || — || align=right | 5.9 km || 
|-id=590 bgcolor=#E9E9E9
| 133590 ||  || — || October 18, 2003 || Kitt Peak || Spacewatch || — || align=right | 1.2 km || 
|-id=591 bgcolor=#E9E9E9
| 133591 ||  || — || October 18, 2003 || Kitt Peak || Spacewatch || MIS || align=right | 4.1 km || 
|-id=592 bgcolor=#d6d6d6
| 133592 ||  || — || October 19, 2003 || Kitt Peak || Spacewatch || — || align=right | 4.3 km || 
|-id=593 bgcolor=#d6d6d6
| 133593 ||  || — || October 17, 2003 || Kitt Peak || Spacewatch || EOS || align=right | 3.9 km || 
|-id=594 bgcolor=#E9E9E9
| 133594 ||  || — || October 18, 2003 || Goodricke-Pigott || R. A. Tucker || GEF || align=right | 2.4 km || 
|-id=595 bgcolor=#E9E9E9
| 133595 ||  || — || October 16, 2003 || Haleakala || NEAT || DOR || align=right | 6.1 km || 
|-id=596 bgcolor=#d6d6d6
| 133596 ||  || — || October 18, 2003 || Palomar || NEAT || — || align=right | 7.2 km || 
|-id=597 bgcolor=#d6d6d6
| 133597 ||  || — || October 19, 2003 || Anderson Mesa || LONEOS || LIX || align=right | 6.1 km || 
|-id=598 bgcolor=#E9E9E9
| 133598 ||  || — || October 19, 2003 || Anderson Mesa || LONEOS || — || align=right | 6.4 km || 
|-id=599 bgcolor=#E9E9E9
| 133599 ||  || — || October 19, 2003 || Anderson Mesa || LONEOS || — || align=right | 3.5 km || 
|-id=600 bgcolor=#d6d6d6
| 133600 ||  || — || October 19, 2003 || Anderson Mesa || LONEOS || — || align=right | 3.6 km || 
|}

133601–133700 

|-bgcolor=#E9E9E9
| 133601 ||  || — || October 20, 2003 || Socorro || LINEAR || — || align=right | 2.8 km || 
|-id=602 bgcolor=#fefefe
| 133602 ||  || — || October 20, 2003 || Palomar || NEAT || — || align=right | 1.6 km || 
|-id=603 bgcolor=#E9E9E9
| 133603 ||  || — || October 18, 2003 || Kitt Peak || Spacewatch || — || align=right | 1.5 km || 
|-id=604 bgcolor=#d6d6d6
| 133604 ||  || — || October 18, 2003 || Kitt Peak || Spacewatch || EOS || align=right | 3.5 km || 
|-id=605 bgcolor=#d6d6d6
| 133605 ||  || — || October 18, 2003 || Kitt Peak || Spacewatch || EOS || align=right | 3.3 km || 
|-id=606 bgcolor=#d6d6d6
| 133606 ||  || — || October 19, 2003 || Anderson Mesa || LONEOS || — || align=right | 8.7 km || 
|-id=607 bgcolor=#fefefe
| 133607 ||  || — || October 19, 2003 || Palomar || NEAT || V || align=right | 1.2 km || 
|-id=608 bgcolor=#d6d6d6
| 133608 ||  || — || October 19, 2003 || Palomar || NEAT || EUP || align=right | 8.0 km || 
|-id=609 bgcolor=#d6d6d6
| 133609 ||  || — || October 20, 2003 || Palomar || NEAT || THM || align=right | 4.2 km || 
|-id=610 bgcolor=#d6d6d6
| 133610 ||  || — || October 20, 2003 || Kitt Peak || Spacewatch || KOR || align=right | 2.9 km || 
|-id=611 bgcolor=#E9E9E9
| 133611 ||  || — || October 19, 2003 || Kitt Peak || Spacewatch || — || align=right | 1.2 km || 
|-id=612 bgcolor=#E9E9E9
| 133612 ||  || — || October 19, 2003 || Kitt Peak || Spacewatch || — || align=right | 2.0 km || 
|-id=613 bgcolor=#d6d6d6
| 133613 ||  || — || October 19, 2003 || Kitt Peak || Spacewatch || — || align=right | 2.9 km || 
|-id=614 bgcolor=#d6d6d6
| 133614 ||  || — || October 20, 2003 || Socorro || LINEAR || HIL3:2 || align=right | 8.2 km || 
|-id=615 bgcolor=#E9E9E9
| 133615 ||  || — || October 20, 2003 || Socorro || LINEAR || — || align=right | 1.9 km || 
|-id=616 bgcolor=#d6d6d6
| 133616 ||  || — || October 21, 2003 || Socorro || LINEAR || VER || align=right | 7.1 km || 
|-id=617 bgcolor=#E9E9E9
| 133617 ||  || — || October 21, 2003 || Socorro || LINEAR || — || align=right | 2.0 km || 
|-id=618 bgcolor=#E9E9E9
| 133618 ||  || — || October 21, 2003 || Socorro || LINEAR || — || align=right | 4.9 km || 
|-id=619 bgcolor=#E9E9E9
| 133619 ||  || — || October 18, 2003 || Socorro || LINEAR || — || align=right | 3.3 km || 
|-id=620 bgcolor=#FA8072
| 133620 ||  || — || October 18, 2003 || Socorro || LINEAR || — || align=right | 2.1 km || 
|-id=621 bgcolor=#d6d6d6
| 133621 ||  || — || October 18, 2003 || Kitt Peak || Spacewatch || 615 || align=right | 2.6 km || 
|-id=622 bgcolor=#E9E9E9
| 133622 ||  || — || October 19, 2003 || Socorro || LINEAR || — || align=right | 1.6 km || 
|-id=623 bgcolor=#E9E9E9
| 133623 ||  || — || October 19, 2003 || Socorro || LINEAR || — || align=right | 3.7 km || 
|-id=624 bgcolor=#E9E9E9
| 133624 ||  || — || October 20, 2003 || Palomar || NEAT || EUN || align=right | 2.5 km || 
|-id=625 bgcolor=#E9E9E9
| 133625 ||  || — || October 21, 2003 || Kitt Peak || Spacewatch || — || align=right | 3.0 km || 
|-id=626 bgcolor=#E9E9E9
| 133626 ||  || — || October 18, 2003 || Palomar || NEAT || — || align=right | 4.6 km || 
|-id=627 bgcolor=#E9E9E9
| 133627 ||  || — || October 19, 2003 || Palomar || NEAT || — || align=right | 3.2 km || 
|-id=628 bgcolor=#E9E9E9
| 133628 ||  || — || October 19, 2003 || Palomar || NEAT || — || align=right | 5.8 km || 
|-id=629 bgcolor=#d6d6d6
| 133629 ||  || — || October 20, 2003 || Palomar || NEAT || HYG || align=right | 6.2 km || 
|-id=630 bgcolor=#E9E9E9
| 133630 ||  || — || October 21, 2003 || Palomar || NEAT || — || align=right | 2.9 km || 
|-id=631 bgcolor=#E9E9E9
| 133631 ||  || — || October 21, 2003 || Socorro || LINEAR || — || align=right | 3.1 km || 
|-id=632 bgcolor=#fefefe
| 133632 ||  || — || October 17, 2003 || Socorro || LINEAR || — || align=right | 1.6 km || 
|-id=633 bgcolor=#fefefe
| 133633 ||  || — || October 18, 2003 || Anderson Mesa || LONEOS || — || align=right | 1.4 km || 
|-id=634 bgcolor=#d6d6d6
| 133634 ||  || — || October 18, 2003 || Anderson Mesa || LONEOS || — || align=right | 6.2 km || 
|-id=635 bgcolor=#fefefe
| 133635 ||  || — || October 18, 2003 || Anderson Mesa || LONEOS || FLO || align=right | 1.4 km || 
|-id=636 bgcolor=#E9E9E9
| 133636 ||  || — || October 18, 2003 || Anderson Mesa || LONEOS || — || align=right | 3.2 km || 
|-id=637 bgcolor=#d6d6d6
| 133637 ||  || — || October 18, 2003 || Anderson Mesa || LONEOS || — || align=right | 10 km || 
|-id=638 bgcolor=#E9E9E9
| 133638 ||  || — || October 18, 2003 || Anderson Mesa || LONEOS || — || align=right | 3.4 km || 
|-id=639 bgcolor=#E9E9E9
| 133639 ||  || — || October 18, 2003 || Anderson Mesa || LONEOS || — || align=right | 2.9 km || 
|-id=640 bgcolor=#E9E9E9
| 133640 ||  || — || October 18, 2003 || Anderson Mesa || LONEOS || — || align=right | 3.4 km || 
|-id=641 bgcolor=#d6d6d6
| 133641 ||  || — || October 18, 2003 || Anderson Mesa || LONEOS || EOS || align=right | 4.9 km || 
|-id=642 bgcolor=#d6d6d6
| 133642 ||  || — || October 18, 2003 || Anderson Mesa || LONEOS || BRA || align=right | 3.2 km || 
|-id=643 bgcolor=#d6d6d6
| 133643 ||  || — || October 18, 2003 || Kitt Peak || Spacewatch || URS || align=right | 7.2 km || 
|-id=644 bgcolor=#E9E9E9
| 133644 ||  || — || October 19, 2003 || Anderson Mesa || LONEOS || — || align=right | 4.2 km || 
|-id=645 bgcolor=#E9E9E9
| 133645 ||  || — || October 20, 2003 || Socorro || LINEAR || — || align=right | 4.0 km || 
|-id=646 bgcolor=#E9E9E9
| 133646 ||  || — || October 21, 2003 || Socorro || LINEAR || HEN || align=right | 2.2 km || 
|-id=647 bgcolor=#fefefe
| 133647 ||  || — || October 21, 2003 || Kitt Peak || Spacewatch || FLO || align=right | 1.00 km || 
|-id=648 bgcolor=#E9E9E9
| 133648 ||  || — || October 20, 2003 || Socorro || LINEAR || — || align=right | 4.3 km || 
|-id=649 bgcolor=#E9E9E9
| 133649 ||  || — || October 20, 2003 || Socorro || LINEAR || — || align=right | 3.1 km || 
|-id=650 bgcolor=#d6d6d6
| 133650 ||  || — || October 21, 2003 || Palomar || NEAT || — || align=right | 4.7 km || 
|-id=651 bgcolor=#d6d6d6
| 133651 ||  || — || October 21, 2003 || Socorro || LINEAR || — || align=right | 5.4 km || 
|-id=652 bgcolor=#E9E9E9
| 133652 ||  || — || October 21, 2003 || Socorro || LINEAR || — || align=right | 5.6 km || 
|-id=653 bgcolor=#d6d6d6
| 133653 ||  || — || October 21, 2003 || Kitt Peak || Spacewatch || — || align=right | 3.8 km || 
|-id=654 bgcolor=#E9E9E9
| 133654 ||  || — || October 22, 2003 || Socorro || LINEAR || — || align=right | 2.5 km || 
|-id=655 bgcolor=#d6d6d6
| 133655 ||  || — || October 22, 2003 || Socorro || LINEAR || — || align=right | 5.6 km || 
|-id=656 bgcolor=#E9E9E9
| 133656 ||  || — || October 22, 2003 || Socorro || LINEAR || — || align=right | 2.5 km || 
|-id=657 bgcolor=#d6d6d6
| 133657 ||  || — || October 22, 2003 || Haleakala || NEAT || HYG || align=right | 5.9 km || 
|-id=658 bgcolor=#d6d6d6
| 133658 ||  || — || October 22, 2003 || Haleakala || NEAT || EOS || align=right | 3.3 km || 
|-id=659 bgcolor=#d6d6d6
| 133659 ||  || — || October 21, 2003 || Kitt Peak || Spacewatch || 628 || align=right | 3.1 km || 
|-id=660 bgcolor=#E9E9E9
| 133660 ||  || — || October 21, 2003 || Kitt Peak || Spacewatch || — || align=right | 4.7 km || 
|-id=661 bgcolor=#E9E9E9
| 133661 ||  || — || October 21, 2003 || Anderson Mesa || LONEOS || — || align=right | 1.3 km || 
|-id=662 bgcolor=#E9E9E9
| 133662 ||  || — || October 21, 2003 || Anderson Mesa || LONEOS || — || align=right | 3.2 km || 
|-id=663 bgcolor=#E9E9E9
| 133663 ||  || — || October 21, 2003 || Socorro || LINEAR || — || align=right | 3.7 km || 
|-id=664 bgcolor=#d6d6d6
| 133664 ||  || — || October 21, 2003 || Palomar || NEAT || — || align=right | 4.4 km || 
|-id=665 bgcolor=#d6d6d6
| 133665 ||  || — || October 21, 2003 || Palomar || NEAT || CHA || align=right | 3.8 km || 
|-id=666 bgcolor=#d6d6d6
| 133666 ||  || — || October 21, 2003 || Palomar || NEAT || — || align=right | 4.5 km || 
|-id=667 bgcolor=#E9E9E9
| 133667 ||  || — || October 21, 2003 || Kitt Peak || Spacewatch || — || align=right | 2.6 km || 
|-id=668 bgcolor=#d6d6d6
| 133668 ||  || — || October 22, 2003 || Kitt Peak || Spacewatch || — || align=right | 7.7 km || 
|-id=669 bgcolor=#E9E9E9
| 133669 ||  || — || October 22, 2003 || Kitt Peak || Spacewatch || GEF || align=right | 2.5 km || 
|-id=670 bgcolor=#E9E9E9
| 133670 ||  || — || October 22, 2003 || Kitt Peak || Spacewatch || — || align=right | 3.0 km || 
|-id=671 bgcolor=#d6d6d6
| 133671 ||  || — || October 22, 2003 || Kitt Peak || Spacewatch || ALA || align=right | 6.9 km || 
|-id=672 bgcolor=#d6d6d6
| 133672 ||  || — || October 22, 2003 || Kitt Peak || Spacewatch || — || align=right | 4.5 km || 
|-id=673 bgcolor=#E9E9E9
| 133673 ||  || — || October 23, 2003 || Anderson Mesa || LONEOS || — || align=right | 2.6 km || 
|-id=674 bgcolor=#d6d6d6
| 133674 ||  || — || October 23, 2003 || Anderson Mesa || LONEOS || — || align=right | 4.3 km || 
|-id=675 bgcolor=#E9E9E9
| 133675 ||  || — || October 20, 2003 || Socorro || LINEAR || — || align=right | 2.3 km || 
|-id=676 bgcolor=#E9E9E9
| 133676 ||  || — || October 21, 2003 || Kitt Peak || Spacewatch || HEN || align=right | 2.3 km || 
|-id=677 bgcolor=#E9E9E9
| 133677 ||  || — || October 21, 2003 || Anderson Mesa || LONEOS || — || align=right | 3.4 km || 
|-id=678 bgcolor=#d6d6d6
| 133678 ||  || — || October 21, 2003 || Anderson Mesa || LONEOS || — || align=right | 3.9 km || 
|-id=679 bgcolor=#d6d6d6
| 133679 ||  || — || October 21, 2003 || Anderson Mesa || LONEOS || — || align=right | 3.8 km || 
|-id=680 bgcolor=#d6d6d6
| 133680 ||  || — || October 21, 2003 || Kitt Peak || Spacewatch || — || align=right | 3.6 km || 
|-id=681 bgcolor=#E9E9E9
| 133681 ||  || — || October 21, 2003 || Socorro || LINEAR || XIZ || align=right | 2.5 km || 
|-id=682 bgcolor=#E9E9E9
| 133682 ||  || — || October 21, 2003 || Socorro || LINEAR || — || align=right | 5.1 km || 
|-id=683 bgcolor=#d6d6d6
| 133683 ||  || — || October 21, 2003 || Socorro || LINEAR || — || align=right | 6.4 km || 
|-id=684 bgcolor=#d6d6d6
| 133684 ||  || — || October 21, 2003 || Palomar || NEAT || EOS || align=right | 3.4 km || 
|-id=685 bgcolor=#E9E9E9
| 133685 ||  || — || October 21, 2003 || Palomar || NEAT || PAD || align=right | 3.0 km || 
|-id=686 bgcolor=#E9E9E9
| 133686 ||  || — || October 22, 2003 || Kitt Peak || Spacewatch || — || align=right | 2.1 km || 
|-id=687 bgcolor=#d6d6d6
| 133687 ||  || — || October 22, 2003 || Socorro || LINEAR || — || align=right | 6.4 km || 
|-id=688 bgcolor=#d6d6d6
| 133688 ||  || — || October 22, 2003 || Socorro || LINEAR || — || align=right | 4.9 km || 
|-id=689 bgcolor=#d6d6d6
| 133689 ||  || — || October 23, 2003 || Haleakala || NEAT || EOS || align=right | 3.7 km || 
|-id=690 bgcolor=#E9E9E9
| 133690 ||  || — || October 21, 2003 || Socorro || LINEAR || — || align=right | 1.3 km || 
|-id=691 bgcolor=#E9E9E9
| 133691 ||  || — || October 21, 2003 || Socorro || LINEAR || — || align=right | 4.4 km || 
|-id=692 bgcolor=#E9E9E9
| 133692 ||  || — || October 21, 2003 || Socorro || LINEAR || — || align=right | 5.9 km || 
|-id=693 bgcolor=#d6d6d6
| 133693 ||  || — || October 21, 2003 || Socorro || LINEAR || — || align=right | 6.2 km || 
|-id=694 bgcolor=#E9E9E9
| 133694 ||  || — || October 22, 2003 || Socorro || LINEAR || — || align=right | 3.1 km || 
|-id=695 bgcolor=#d6d6d6
| 133695 ||  || — || October 22, 2003 || Socorro || LINEAR || EOS || align=right | 3.6 km || 
|-id=696 bgcolor=#E9E9E9
| 133696 ||  || — || October 22, 2003 || Socorro || LINEAR || NEM || align=right | 5.1 km || 
|-id=697 bgcolor=#d6d6d6
| 133697 ||  || — || October 22, 2003 || Socorro || LINEAR || BRA || align=right | 3.5 km || 
|-id=698 bgcolor=#d6d6d6
| 133698 ||  || — || October 23, 2003 || Kitt Peak || Spacewatch || — || align=right | 7.2 km || 
|-id=699 bgcolor=#E9E9E9
| 133699 ||  || — || October 23, 2003 || Kitt Peak || Spacewatch || — || align=right | 2.9 km || 
|-id=700 bgcolor=#d6d6d6
| 133700 ||  || — || October 23, 2003 || Kitt Peak || Spacewatch || HYG || align=right | 5.2 km || 
|}

133701–133800 

|-bgcolor=#E9E9E9
| 133701 ||  || — || October 23, 2003 || Kitt Peak || Spacewatch || — || align=right | 2.6 km || 
|-id=702 bgcolor=#E9E9E9
| 133702 ||  || — || October 24, 2003 || Socorro || LINEAR || — || align=right | 4.6 km || 
|-id=703 bgcolor=#d6d6d6
| 133703 ||  || — || October 24, 2003 || Kitt Peak || Spacewatch || — || align=right | 4.6 km || 
|-id=704 bgcolor=#E9E9E9
| 133704 ||  || — || October 24, 2003 || Kitt Peak || Spacewatch || AGN || align=right | 1.5 km || 
|-id=705 bgcolor=#d6d6d6
| 133705 ||  || — || October 24, 2003 || Socorro || LINEAR || KOR || align=right | 2.3 km || 
|-id=706 bgcolor=#fefefe
| 133706 ||  || — || October 24, 2003 || Socorro || LINEAR || — || align=right | 1.2 km || 
|-id=707 bgcolor=#d6d6d6
| 133707 ||  || — || October 24, 2003 || Socorro || LINEAR || — || align=right | 4.2 km || 
|-id=708 bgcolor=#d6d6d6
| 133708 ||  || — || October 24, 2003 || Socorro || LINEAR || — || align=right | 5.6 km || 
|-id=709 bgcolor=#d6d6d6
| 133709 ||  || — || October 24, 2003 || Socorro || LINEAR || — || align=right | 5.2 km || 
|-id=710 bgcolor=#E9E9E9
| 133710 ||  || — || October 24, 2003 || Kitt Peak || Spacewatch || AST || align=right | 3.4 km || 
|-id=711 bgcolor=#d6d6d6
| 133711 ||  || — || October 24, 2003 || Socorro || LINEAR || — || align=right | 5.1 km || 
|-id=712 bgcolor=#E9E9E9
| 133712 ||  || — || October 25, 2003 || Socorro || LINEAR || — || align=right | 1.9 km || 
|-id=713 bgcolor=#E9E9E9
| 133713 ||  || — || October 25, 2003 || Kitt Peak || Spacewatch || — || align=right | 4.3 km || 
|-id=714 bgcolor=#d6d6d6
| 133714 ||  || — || October 25, 2003 || Socorro || LINEAR || — || align=right | 6.0 km || 
|-id=715 bgcolor=#d6d6d6
| 133715 ||  || — || October 25, 2003 || Socorro || LINEAR || — || align=right | 4.9 km || 
|-id=716 bgcolor=#d6d6d6
| 133716 Tomtourville ||  ||  || October 26, 2003 || Catalina || CSS || KOR || align=right | 2.9 km || 
|-id=717 bgcolor=#d6d6d6
| 133717 ||  || — || October 27, 2003 || Socorro || LINEAR || THM || align=right | 4.4 km || 
|-id=718 bgcolor=#d6d6d6
| 133718 ||  || — || October 25, 2003 || Socorro || LINEAR || — || align=right | 6.5 km || 
|-id=719 bgcolor=#E9E9E9
| 133719 ||  || — || October 25, 2003 || Socorro || LINEAR || — || align=right | 4.4 km || 
|-id=720 bgcolor=#E9E9E9
| 133720 ||  || — || October 25, 2003 || Socorro || LINEAR || — || align=right | 3.1 km || 
|-id=721 bgcolor=#d6d6d6
| 133721 ||  || — || October 25, 2003 || Socorro || LINEAR || ALA || align=right | 7.4 km || 
|-id=722 bgcolor=#d6d6d6
| 133722 ||  || — || October 26, 2003 || Kitt Peak || Spacewatch || — || align=right | 4.4 km || 
|-id=723 bgcolor=#d6d6d6
| 133723 ||  || — || October 26, 2003 || Kitt Peak || Spacewatch || — || align=right | 4.9 km || 
|-id=724 bgcolor=#d6d6d6
| 133724 ||  || — || October 26, 2003 || Haleakala || NEAT || KOR || align=right | 2.3 km || 
|-id=725 bgcolor=#d6d6d6
| 133725 ||  || — || October 27, 2003 || Socorro || LINEAR || — || align=right | 5.3 km || 
|-id=726 bgcolor=#d6d6d6
| 133726 Gateswest ||  ||  || October 29, 2003 || Catalina || CSS || — || align=right | 6.5 km || 
|-id=727 bgcolor=#d6d6d6
| 133727 ||  || — || October 28, 2003 || Bergisch Gladbach || W. Bickel || URS || align=right | 5.3 km || 
|-id=728 bgcolor=#E9E9E9
| 133728 ||  || — || October 17, 2003 || Palomar || NEAT || AGN || align=right | 2.1 km || 
|-id=729 bgcolor=#d6d6d6
| 133729 ||  || — || October 29, 2003 || Socorro || LINEAR || KOR || align=right | 2.4 km || 
|-id=730 bgcolor=#d6d6d6
| 133730 ||  || — || October 29, 2003 || Kitt Peak || Spacewatch || — || align=right | 5.5 km || 
|-id=731 bgcolor=#d6d6d6
| 133731 ||  || — || October 29, 2003 || Socorro || LINEAR || KOR || align=right | 2.5 km || 
|-id=732 bgcolor=#E9E9E9
| 133732 ||  || — || October 29, 2003 || Socorro || LINEAR || HEN || align=right | 1.9 km || 
|-id=733 bgcolor=#E9E9E9
| 133733 ||  || — || October 29, 2003 || Socorro || LINEAR || — || align=right | 3.3 km || 
|-id=734 bgcolor=#E9E9E9
| 133734 ||  || — || October 29, 2003 || Anderson Mesa || LONEOS || AER || align=right | 3.0 km || 
|-id=735 bgcolor=#d6d6d6
| 133735 ||  || — || October 16, 2003 || Kitt Peak || Spacewatch || — || align=right | 3.8 km || 
|-id=736 bgcolor=#d6d6d6
| 133736 ||  || — || November 2, 2003 || Socorro || LINEAR || KOR || align=right | 2.9 km || 
|-id=737 bgcolor=#E9E9E9
| 133737 ||  || — || November 15, 2003 || Kitt Peak || Spacewatch || — || align=right | 5.0 km || 
|-id=738 bgcolor=#d6d6d6
| 133738 ||  || — || November 12, 2003 || Haleakala || NEAT || SAN || align=right | 3.4 km || 
|-id=739 bgcolor=#d6d6d6
| 133739 ||  || — || November 15, 2003 || Kitt Peak || Spacewatch || — || align=right | 5.0 km || 
|-id=740 bgcolor=#d6d6d6
| 133740 ||  || — || November 15, 2003 || Palomar || NEAT || — || align=right | 3.3 km || 
|-id=741 bgcolor=#d6d6d6
| 133741 ||  || — || November 2, 2003 || Socorro || LINEAR || ANF || align=right | 2.7 km || 
|-id=742 bgcolor=#d6d6d6
| 133742 ||  || — || November 15, 2003 || Palomar || NEAT || KOR || align=right | 2.6 km || 
|-id=743 bgcolor=#d6d6d6
| 133743 Robertwoodward || 2003 WM ||  || November 16, 2003 || Catalina || CSS || — || align=right | 6.5 km || 
|-id=744 bgcolor=#E9E9E9
| 133744 Dellagiustina ||  ||  || November 16, 2003 || Catalina || CSS || — || align=right | 3.0 km || 
|-id=745 bgcolor=#d6d6d6
| 133745 Danieldrinnon ||  ||  || November 16, 2003 || Catalina || CSS || KOR || align=right | 2.2 km || 
|-id=746 bgcolor=#E9E9E9
| 133746 Tonyferro ||  ||  || November 16, 2003 || Catalina || CSS || AGN || align=right | 2.1 km || 
|-id=747 bgcolor=#E9E9E9
| 133747 Robertofurfaro ||  ||  || November 16, 2003 || Catalina || CSS || — || align=right | 4.5 km || 
|-id=748 bgcolor=#d6d6d6
| 133748 ||  || — || November 16, 2003 || Kitt Peak || Spacewatch || — || align=right | 6.0 km || 
|-id=749 bgcolor=#d6d6d6
| 133749 ||  || — || November 18, 2003 || Palomar || NEAT || — || align=right | 4.0 km || 
|-id=750 bgcolor=#E9E9E9
| 133750 ||  || — || November 18, 2003 || Kitt Peak || Spacewatch || — || align=right | 2.6 km || 
|-id=751 bgcolor=#d6d6d6
| 133751 ||  || — || November 18, 2003 || Kitt Peak || Spacewatch || — || align=right | 7.5 km || 
|-id=752 bgcolor=#E9E9E9
| 133752 ||  || — || November 18, 2003 || Kitt Peak || Spacewatch || HEN || align=right | 2.2 km || 
|-id=753 bgcolor=#d6d6d6
| 133753 Teresamullen ||  ||  || November 21, 2003 || Junk Bond || D. Healy || THM || align=right | 4.0 km || 
|-id=754 bgcolor=#d6d6d6
| 133754 ||  || — || November 16, 2003 || Kitt Peak || Spacewatch || HYG || align=right | 4.6 km || 
|-id=755 bgcolor=#d6d6d6
| 133755 ||  || — || November 18, 2003 || Palomar || NEAT || HYG || align=right | 4.9 km || 
|-id=756 bgcolor=#E9E9E9
| 133756 Carinajohnson ||  ||  || November 19, 2003 || Catalina || CSS || — || align=right | 2.5 km || 
|-id=757 bgcolor=#d6d6d6
| 133757 ||  || — || November 17, 2003 || Catalina || CSS || BRA || align=right | 3.5 km || 
|-id=758 bgcolor=#E9E9E9
| 133758 ||  || — || November 19, 2003 || Palomar || NEAT || — || align=right | 3.6 km || 
|-id=759 bgcolor=#d6d6d6
| 133759 ||  || — || November 19, 2003 || Kitt Peak || Spacewatch || — || align=right | 3.6 km || 
|-id=760 bgcolor=#d6d6d6
| 133760 ||  || — || November 18, 2003 || Kitt Peak || Spacewatch || — || align=right | 3.8 km || 
|-id=761 bgcolor=#d6d6d6
| 133761 ||  || — || November 18, 2003 || Kitt Peak || Spacewatch || THM || align=right | 3.3 km || 
|-id=762 bgcolor=#d6d6d6
| 133762 ||  || — || November 19, 2003 || Kitt Peak || Spacewatch || TIR || align=right | 5.5 km || 
|-id=763 bgcolor=#d6d6d6
| 133763 ||  || — || November 19, 2003 || Kitt Peak || Spacewatch || — || align=right | 3.5 km || 
|-id=764 bgcolor=#d6d6d6
| 133764 ||  || — || November 19, 2003 || Kitt Peak || Spacewatch || — || align=right | 5.7 km || 
|-id=765 bgcolor=#d6d6d6
| 133765 ||  || — || November 19, 2003 || Kitt Peak || Spacewatch || THM || align=right | 5.0 km || 
|-id=766 bgcolor=#d6d6d6
| 133766 ||  || — || November 19, 2003 || Kitt Peak || Spacewatch || — || align=right | 4.5 km || 
|-id=767 bgcolor=#d6d6d6
| 133767 ||  || — || November 19, 2003 || Kitt Peak || Spacewatch || VER || align=right | 4.6 km || 
|-id=768 bgcolor=#d6d6d6
| 133768 ||  || — || November 19, 2003 || Kitt Peak || Spacewatch || 7:4 || align=right | 6.9 km || 
|-id=769 bgcolor=#E9E9E9
| 133769 ||  || — || November 20, 2003 || Socorro || LINEAR || — || align=right | 4.4 km || 
|-id=770 bgcolor=#d6d6d6
| 133770 ||  || — || November 19, 2003 || Socorro || LINEAR || — || align=right | 4.7 km || 
|-id=771 bgcolor=#d6d6d6
| 133771 ||  || — || November 19, 2003 || Palomar || NEAT || — || align=right | 3.2 km || 
|-id=772 bgcolor=#d6d6d6
| 133772 ||  || — || November 20, 2003 || Socorro || LINEAR || — || align=right | 6.4 km || 
|-id=773 bgcolor=#d6d6d6
| 133773 Lindsaykeller ||  ||  || November 19, 2003 || Catalina || CSS || — || align=right | 6.0 km || 
|-id=774 bgcolor=#E9E9E9
| 133774 Johnkidd ||  ||  || November 16, 2003 || Catalina || CSS || — || align=right | 2.5 km || 
|-id=775 bgcolor=#E9E9E9
| 133775 ||  || — || November 18, 2003 || Kitt Peak || Spacewatch || — || align=right | 3.8 km || 
|-id=776 bgcolor=#d6d6d6
| 133776 ||  || — || November 19, 2003 || Anderson Mesa || LONEOS || — || align=right | 6.8 km || 
|-id=777 bgcolor=#d6d6d6
| 133777 ||  || — || November 19, 2003 || Anderson Mesa || LONEOS || — || align=right | 3.8 km || 
|-id=778 bgcolor=#E9E9E9
| 133778 ||  || — || November 19, 2003 || Anderson Mesa || LONEOS || — || align=right | 2.0 km || 
|-id=779 bgcolor=#E9E9E9
| 133779 ||  || — || November 19, 2003 || Anderson Mesa || LONEOS || — || align=right | 2.0 km || 
|-id=780 bgcolor=#d6d6d6
| 133780 ||  || — || November 19, 2003 || Anderson Mesa || LONEOS || LUT || align=right | 9.8 km || 
|-id=781 bgcolor=#E9E9E9
| 133781 ||  || — || November 20, 2003 || Socorro || LINEAR || — || align=right | 4.4 km || 
|-id=782 bgcolor=#E9E9E9
| 133782 Saraknutson ||  ||  || November 20, 2003 || Catalina || CSS || — || align=right | 2.4 km || 
|-id=783 bgcolor=#d6d6d6
| 133783 ||  || — || November 21, 2003 || Socorro || LINEAR || — || align=right | 5.8 km || 
|-id=784 bgcolor=#d6d6d6
| 133784 ||  || — || November 21, 2003 || Socorro || LINEAR || EOS || align=right | 4.1 km || 
|-id=785 bgcolor=#d6d6d6
| 133785 ||  || — || November 21, 2003 || Socorro || LINEAR || — || align=right | 4.7 km || 
|-id=786 bgcolor=#d6d6d6
| 133786 ||  || — || November 20, 2003 || Socorro || LINEAR || — || align=right | 5.0 km || 
|-id=787 bgcolor=#d6d6d6
| 133787 ||  || — || November 20, 2003 || Socorro || LINEAR || EOS || align=right | 4.1 km || 
|-id=788 bgcolor=#E9E9E9
| 133788 ||  || — || November 20, 2003 || Socorro || LINEAR || — || align=right | 5.1 km || 
|-id=789 bgcolor=#d6d6d6
| 133789 ||  || — || November 20, 2003 || Socorro || LINEAR || — || align=right | 4.7 km || 
|-id=790 bgcolor=#d6d6d6
| 133790 ||  || — || November 20, 2003 || Socorro || LINEAR || — || align=right | 5.6 km || 
|-id=791 bgcolor=#d6d6d6
| 133791 ||  || — || November 20, 2003 || Socorro || LINEAR || ALA || align=right | 6.6 km || 
|-id=792 bgcolor=#E9E9E9
| 133792 ||  || — || November 20, 2003 || Socorro || LINEAR || — || align=right | 2.8 km || 
|-id=793 bgcolor=#d6d6d6
| 133793 ||  || — || November 21, 2003 || Socorro || LINEAR || — || align=right | 4.4 km || 
|-id=794 bgcolor=#E9E9E9
| 133794 ||  || — || November 21, 2003 || Socorro || LINEAR || — || align=right | 5.6 km || 
|-id=795 bgcolor=#d6d6d6
| 133795 ||  || — || November 19, 2003 || Kitt Peak || Spacewatch || THM || align=right | 5.3 km || 
|-id=796 bgcolor=#d6d6d6
| 133796 ||  || — || November 21, 2003 || Socorro || LINEAR || — || align=right | 6.0 km || 
|-id=797 bgcolor=#d6d6d6
| 133797 ||  || — || November 21, 2003 || Socorro || LINEAR || — || align=right | 4.8 km || 
|-id=798 bgcolor=#d6d6d6
| 133798 ||  || — || November 21, 2003 || Socorro || LINEAR || — || align=right | 6.7 km || 
|-id=799 bgcolor=#d6d6d6
| 133799 ||  || — || November 21, 2003 || Socorro || LINEAR || — || align=right | 9.1 km || 
|-id=800 bgcolor=#d6d6d6
| 133800 ||  || — || November 21, 2003 || Socorro || LINEAR || — || align=right | 4.8 km || 
|}

133801–133900 

|-bgcolor=#d6d6d6
| 133801 ||  || — || November 21, 2003 || Socorro || LINEAR || — || align=right | 8.9 km || 
|-id=802 bgcolor=#d6d6d6
| 133802 ||  || — || November 21, 2003 || Socorro || LINEAR || — || align=right | 4.4 km || 
|-id=803 bgcolor=#d6d6d6
| 133803 ||  || — || November 23, 2003 || Kitt Peak || Spacewatch || — || align=right | 5.1 km || 
|-id=804 bgcolor=#d6d6d6
| 133804 ||  || — || November 24, 2003 || Palomar || NEAT || — || align=right | 6.3 km || 
|-id=805 bgcolor=#d6d6d6
| 133805 ||  || — || November 24, 2003 || Anderson Mesa || LONEOS || HYG || align=right | 7.6 km || 
|-id=806 bgcolor=#d6d6d6
| 133806 ||  || — || November 26, 2003 || Kitt Peak || Spacewatch || — || align=right | 4.3 km || 
|-id=807 bgcolor=#E9E9E9
| 133807 ||  || — || November 24, 2003 || Desert Moon || B. L. Stevens || — || align=right | 3.4 km || 
|-id=808 bgcolor=#E9E9E9
| 133808 ||  || — || November 26, 2003 || Anderson Mesa || LONEOS || — || align=right | 3.1 km || 
|-id=809 bgcolor=#fefefe
| 133809 ||  || — || November 26, 2003 || Anderson Mesa || LONEOS || — || align=right | 2.1 km || 
|-id=810 bgcolor=#E9E9E9
| 133810 ||  || — || November 29, 2003 || Socorro || LINEAR || EUN || align=right | 2.2 km || 
|-id=811 bgcolor=#E9E9E9
| 133811 ||  || — || November 26, 2003 || Moonedge || F. Schiralli Jr. || GEF || align=right | 4.1 km || 
|-id=812 bgcolor=#E9E9E9
| 133812 ||  || — || November 19, 2003 || Kitt Peak || Spacewatch || HOF || align=right | 4.4 km || 
|-id=813 bgcolor=#d6d6d6
| 133813 ||  || — || November 19, 2003 || Socorro || LINEAR || — || align=right | 6.6 km || 
|-id=814 bgcolor=#d6d6d6
| 133814 Wenjengko ||  ||  || November 20, 2003 || Catalina || CSS || — || align=right | 5.3 km || 
|-id=815 bgcolor=#d6d6d6
| 133815 ||  || — || November 30, 2003 || Socorro || LINEAR || EOS || align=right | 3.8 km || 
|-id=816 bgcolor=#d6d6d6
| 133816 ||  || — || November 30, 2003 || Kitt Peak || Spacewatch || — || align=right | 4.9 km || 
|-id=817 bgcolor=#d6d6d6
| 133817 ||  || — || November 18, 2003 || Palomar || NEAT || — || align=right | 4.7 km || 
|-id=818 bgcolor=#d6d6d6
| 133818 ||  || — || November 29, 2003 || Socorro || LINEAR || — || align=right | 4.7 km || 
|-id=819 bgcolor=#FA8072
| 133819 || 2003 XS || — || December 3, 2003 || Socorro || LINEAR || — || align=right | 1.8 km || 
|-id=820 bgcolor=#E9E9E9
| 133820 ||  || — || December 1, 2003 || Socorro || LINEAR || — || align=right | 2.0 km || 
|-id=821 bgcolor=#d6d6d6
| 133821 ||  || — || December 1, 2003 || Socorro || LINEAR || — || align=right | 8.1 km || 
|-id=822 bgcolor=#d6d6d6
| 133822 ||  || — || December 1, 2003 || Socorro || LINEAR || EOS || align=right | 3.9 km || 
|-id=823 bgcolor=#d6d6d6
| 133823 ||  || — || December 1, 2003 || Socorro || LINEAR || — || align=right | 7.1 km || 
|-id=824 bgcolor=#d6d6d6
| 133824 ||  || — || December 1, 2003 || Socorro || LINEAR || EOS || align=right | 4.4 km || 
|-id=825 bgcolor=#fefefe
| 133825 ||  || — || December 4, 2003 || Socorro || LINEAR || FLO || align=right | 1.3 km || 
|-id=826 bgcolor=#d6d6d6
| 133826 ||  || — || December 14, 2003 || Kitt Peak || Spacewatch || — || align=right | 10 km || 
|-id=827 bgcolor=#fefefe
| 133827 ||  || — || December 14, 2003 || Palomar || NEAT || — || align=right | 1.4 km || 
|-id=828 bgcolor=#E9E9E9
| 133828 ||  || — || December 1, 2003 || Kitt Peak || Spacewatch || — || align=right | 3.3 km || 
|-id=829 bgcolor=#d6d6d6
| 133829 ||  || — || December 1, 2003 || Kitt Peak || Spacewatch || KOR || align=right | 2.1 km || 
|-id=830 bgcolor=#d6d6d6
| 133830 ||  || — || December 1, 2003 || Kitt Peak || Spacewatch || THM || align=right | 3.3 km || 
|-id=831 bgcolor=#E9E9E9
| 133831 ||  || — || December 4, 2003 || Socorro || LINEAR || — || align=right | 2.2 km || 
|-id=832 bgcolor=#d6d6d6
| 133832 Loveridge ||  ||  || December 5, 2003 || Catalina || CSS || MEL || align=right | 5.9 km || 
|-id=833 bgcolor=#d6d6d6
| 133833 ||  || — || December 5, 2003 || Socorro || LINEAR || — || align=right | 7.9 km || 
|-id=834 bgcolor=#E9E9E9
| 133834 Erinmorton ||  ||  || December 16, 2003 || Catalina || CSS || — || align=right | 5.4 km || 
|-id=835 bgcolor=#d6d6d6
| 133835 ||  || — || December 16, 2003 || Kitt Peak || Spacewatch || — || align=right | 4.6 km || 
|-id=836 bgcolor=#d6d6d6
| 133836 ||  || — || December 17, 2003 || Socorro || LINEAR || — || align=right | 5.7 km || 
|-id=837 bgcolor=#d6d6d6
| 133837 ||  || — || December 17, 2003 || Anderson Mesa || LONEOS || — || align=right | 5.0 km || 
|-id=838 bgcolor=#d6d6d6
| 133838 ||  || — || December 16, 2003 || Črni Vrh || Črni Vrh || HYG || align=right | 6.0 km || 
|-id=839 bgcolor=#d6d6d6
| 133839 ||  || — || December 18, 2003 || Socorro || LINEAR || THM || align=right | 5.3 km || 
|-id=840 bgcolor=#d6d6d6
| 133840 ||  || — || December 18, 2003 || Socorro || LINEAR || — || align=right | 4.4 km || 
|-id=841 bgcolor=#d6d6d6
| 133841 ||  || — || December 19, 2003 || Kitt Peak || Spacewatch || 628 || align=right | 4.5 km || 
|-id=842 bgcolor=#d6d6d6
| 133842 ||  || — || December 19, 2003 || Socorro || LINEAR || — || align=right | 5.0 km || 
|-id=843 bgcolor=#E9E9E9
| 133843 ||  || — || December 19, 2003 || Kitt Peak || Spacewatch || EUN || align=right | 2.2 km || 
|-id=844 bgcolor=#d6d6d6
| 133844 ||  || — || December 19, 2003 || Kitt Peak || Spacewatch || — || align=right | 5.7 km || 
|-id=845 bgcolor=#d6d6d6
| 133845 ||  || — || December 19, 2003 || Socorro || LINEAR || — || align=right | 7.3 km || 
|-id=846 bgcolor=#d6d6d6
| 133846 ||  || — || December 18, 2003 || Socorro || LINEAR || EOS || align=right | 4.7 km || 
|-id=847 bgcolor=#d6d6d6
| 133847 ||  || — || December 18, 2003 || Socorro || LINEAR || — || align=right | 5.3 km || 
|-id=848 bgcolor=#d6d6d6
| 133848 ||  || — || December 18, 2003 || Socorro || LINEAR || EOS || align=right | 4.2 km || 
|-id=849 bgcolor=#fefefe
| 133849 ||  || — || December 18, 2003 || Socorro || LINEAR || — || align=right | 2.2 km || 
|-id=850 bgcolor=#d6d6d6
| 133850 Heatherroper ||  ||  || December 19, 2003 || Catalina || CSS || — || align=right | 5.6 km || 
|-id=851 bgcolor=#d6d6d6
| 133851 ||  || — || December 19, 2003 || Kitt Peak || Spacewatch || — || align=right | 6.2 km || 
|-id=852 bgcolor=#d6d6d6
| 133852 ||  || — || December 19, 2003 || Socorro || LINEAR || — || align=right | 7.9 km || 
|-id=853 bgcolor=#C2FFFF
| 133853 ||  || — || December 28, 2003 || Socorro || LINEAR || L5 || align=right | 16 km || 
|-id=854 bgcolor=#E9E9E9
| 133854 Wargetz ||  ||  || December 29, 2003 || Catalina || CSS || — || align=right | 2.1 km || 
|-id=855 bgcolor=#d6d6d6
| 133855 ||  || — || December 17, 2003 || Kitt Peak || Spacewatch || EOS || align=right | 4.2 km || 
|-id=856 bgcolor=#d6d6d6
| 133856 ||  || — || December 24, 2003 || Haleakala || NEAT || — || align=right | 4.2 km || 
|-id=857 bgcolor=#E9E9E9
| 133857 ||  || — || January 5, 2004 || Socorro || LINEAR || — || align=right | 4.8 km || 
|-id=858 bgcolor=#d6d6d6
| 133858 ||  || — || January 12, 2004 || Palomar || NEAT || — || align=right | 9.7 km || 
|-id=859 bgcolor=#d6d6d6
| 133859 ||  || — || January 12, 2004 || Palomar || NEAT || EOS || align=right | 4.2 km || 
|-id=860 bgcolor=#d6d6d6
| 133860 ||  || — || January 19, 2004 || Anderson Mesa || LONEOS || — || align=right | 4.6 km || 
|-id=861 bgcolor=#d6d6d6
| 133861 Debrawilmer ||  ||  || January 19, 2004 || Catalina || CSS || — || align=right | 6.6 km || 
|-id=862 bgcolor=#C2FFFF
| 133862 ||  || — || January 20, 2004 || Socorro || LINEAR || L5 || align=right | 17 km || 
|-id=863 bgcolor=#d6d6d6
| 133863 ||  || — || January 21, 2004 || Socorro || LINEAR || EOS || align=right | 3.5 km || 
|-id=864 bgcolor=#fefefe
| 133864 ||  || — || January 22, 2004 || Socorro || LINEAR || — || align=right | 1.4 km || 
|-id=865 bgcolor=#d6d6d6
| 133865 ||  || — || January 20, 2004 || Socorro || LINEAR || TIR || align=right | 7.1 km || 
|-id=866 bgcolor=#d6d6d6
| 133866 ||  || — || January 25, 2004 || Haleakala || NEAT || — || align=right | 7.7 km || 
|-id=867 bgcolor=#E9E9E9
| 133867 ||  || — || January 28, 2004 || Kitt Peak || Spacewatch || — || align=right | 5.8 km || 
|-id=868 bgcolor=#d6d6d6
| 133868 ||  || — || March 18, 2004 || Palomar || NEAT || ALA || align=right | 8.2 km || 
|-id=869 bgcolor=#E9E9E9
| 133869 ||  || — || March 16, 2004 || Socorro || LINEAR || — || align=right | 4.8 km || 
|-id=870 bgcolor=#E9E9E9
| 133870 ||  || — || April 20, 2004 || Socorro || LINEAR || MRX || align=right | 2.2 km || 
|-id=871 bgcolor=#E9E9E9
| 133871 ||  || — || May 12, 2004 || Siding Spring || SSS || NEM || align=right | 3.2 km || 
|-id=872 bgcolor=#E9E9E9
| 133872 ||  || — || May 17, 2004 || Socorro || LINEAR || KON || align=right | 3.2 km || 
|-id=873 bgcolor=#fefefe
| 133873 ||  || — || June 15, 2004 || Socorro || LINEAR || ERI || align=right | 3.3 km || 
|-id=874 bgcolor=#fefefe
| 133874 Jonnazucarelli ||  ||  || June 17, 2004 || Catalina || CSS || H || align=right | 1.2 km || 
|-id=875 bgcolor=#E9E9E9
| 133875 ||  || — || July 11, 2004 || Socorro || LINEAR || — || align=right | 1.7 km || 
|-id=876 bgcolor=#fefefe
| 133876 ||  || — || August 8, 2004 || Socorro || LINEAR || H || align=right | 1.5 km || 
|-id=877 bgcolor=#fefefe
| 133877 ||  || — || August 7, 2004 || Palomar || NEAT || — || align=right | 1.3 km || 
|-id=878 bgcolor=#fefefe
| 133878 ||  || — || August 8, 2004 || Anderson Mesa || LONEOS || — || align=right | 1.6 km || 
|-id=879 bgcolor=#E9E9E9
| 133879 ||  || — || August 8, 2004 || Socorro || LINEAR || — || align=right | 3.0 km || 
|-id=880 bgcolor=#fefefe
| 133880 ||  || — || August 10, 2004 || Socorro || LINEAR || — || align=right | 1.3 km || 
|-id=881 bgcolor=#fefefe
| 133881 ||  || — || August 10, 2004 || Socorro || LINEAR || NYS || align=right | 1.1 km || 
|-id=882 bgcolor=#fefefe
| 133882 ||  || — || August 11, 2004 || Socorro || LINEAR || — || align=right | 3.3 km || 
|-id=883 bgcolor=#fefefe
| 133883 ||  || — || August 10, 2004 || Socorro || LINEAR || — || align=right | 1.4 km || 
|-id=884 bgcolor=#E9E9E9
| 133884 ||  || — || August 11, 2004 || Socorro || LINEAR || POS || align=right | 7.0 km || 
|-id=885 bgcolor=#E9E9E9
| 133885 ||  || — || August 11, 2004 || Socorro || LINEAR || — || align=right | 4.4 km || 
|-id=886 bgcolor=#d6d6d6
| 133886 ||  || — || August 11, 2004 || Socorro || LINEAR || — || align=right | 4.9 km || 
|-id=887 bgcolor=#E9E9E9
| 133887 ||  || — || August 12, 2004 || Socorro || LINEAR || — || align=right | 3.4 km || 
|-id=888 bgcolor=#fefefe
| 133888 ||  || — || August 21, 2004 || Goodricke-Pigott || R. A. Tucker || — || align=right | 1.3 km || 
|-id=889 bgcolor=#fefefe
| 133889 Nicholasmills ||  ||  || August 20, 2004 || Catalina || CSS || — || align=right | 2.2 km || 
|-id=890 bgcolor=#fefefe
| 133890 ||  || — || August 25, 2004 || Socorro || LINEAR || H || align=right | 1.0 km || 
|-id=891 bgcolor=#fefefe
| 133891 Jaesubhong ||  ||  || August 20, 2004 || Catalina || CSS || V || align=right | 1.3 km || 
|-id=892 bgcolor=#E9E9E9
| 133892 Benkhaldoun ||  ||  || September 7, 2004 || Ottmarsheim || C. Rinner || — || align=right | 2.5 km || 
|-id=893 bgcolor=#fefefe
| 133893 ||  || — || September 7, 2004 || Kitt Peak || Spacewatch || FLO || align=right data-sort-value="0.84" | 840 m || 
|-id=894 bgcolor=#fefefe
| 133894 ||  || — || September 4, 2004 || Palomar || NEAT || V || align=right | 1.0 km || 
|-id=895 bgcolor=#fefefe
| 133895 ||  || — || September 7, 2004 || Socorro || LINEAR || FLO || align=right | 1.0 km || 
|-id=896 bgcolor=#E9E9E9
| 133896 ||  || — || September 7, 2004 || Socorro || LINEAR || — || align=right | 3.5 km || 
|-id=897 bgcolor=#fefefe
| 133897 ||  || — || September 7, 2004 || Kitt Peak || Spacewatch || FLO || align=right | 1.3 km || 
|-id=898 bgcolor=#fefefe
| 133898 ||  || — || September 8, 2004 || Socorro || LINEAR || — || align=right | 1.4 km || 
|-id=899 bgcolor=#fefefe
| 133899 ||  || — || September 8, 2004 || Socorro || LINEAR || — || align=right | 1.8 km || 
|-id=900 bgcolor=#E9E9E9
| 133900 ||  || — || September 8, 2004 || Socorro || LINEAR || — || align=right | 2.0 km || 
|}

133901–134000 

|-bgcolor=#fefefe
| 133901 ||  || — || September 8, 2004 || Socorro || LINEAR || NYS || align=right | 2.8 km || 
|-id=902 bgcolor=#fefefe
| 133902 ||  || — || September 10, 2004 || Socorro || LINEAR || H || align=right | 1.2 km || 
|-id=903 bgcolor=#fefefe
| 133903 ||  || — || September 7, 2004 || Bergisch Gladbach || W. Bickel || MAS || align=right data-sort-value="0.98" | 980 m || 
|-id=904 bgcolor=#fefefe
| 133904 ||  || — || September 8, 2004 || Socorro || LINEAR || KLI || align=right | 3.8 km || 
|-id=905 bgcolor=#fefefe
| 133905 ||  || — || September 8, 2004 || Socorro || LINEAR || — || align=right | 1.7 km || 
|-id=906 bgcolor=#fefefe
| 133906 ||  || — || September 8, 2004 || Palomar || NEAT || NYS || align=right data-sort-value="0.90" | 900 m || 
|-id=907 bgcolor=#fefefe
| 133907 ||  || — || September 9, 2004 || Socorro || LINEAR || FLO || align=right | 1.1 km || 
|-id=908 bgcolor=#d6d6d6
| 133908 ||  || — || September 6, 2004 || Socorro || LINEAR || — || align=right | 10 km || 
|-id=909 bgcolor=#fefefe
| 133909 ||  || — || September 9, 2004 || Socorro || LINEAR || V || align=right | 1.3 km || 
|-id=910 bgcolor=#fefefe
| 133910 ||  || — || September 10, 2004 || Socorro || LINEAR || — || align=right | 1.4 km || 
|-id=911 bgcolor=#fefefe
| 133911 ||  || — || September 10, 2004 || Socorro || LINEAR || H || align=right data-sort-value="0.78" | 780 m || 
|-id=912 bgcolor=#fefefe
| 133912 ||  || — || September 10, 2004 || Socorro || LINEAR || V || align=right | 1.1 km || 
|-id=913 bgcolor=#d6d6d6
| 133913 ||  || — || September 10, 2004 || Socorro || LINEAR || — || align=right | 5.5 km || 
|-id=914 bgcolor=#E9E9E9
| 133914 ||  || — || September 10, 2004 || Socorro || LINEAR || EUN || align=right | 2.5 km || 
|-id=915 bgcolor=#d6d6d6
| 133915 ||  || — || September 10, 2004 || Socorro || LINEAR || EUP || align=right | 7.5 km || 
|-id=916 bgcolor=#fefefe
| 133916 ||  || — || September 9, 2004 || Kitt Peak || Spacewatch || NYS || align=right data-sort-value="0.91" | 910 m || 
|-id=917 bgcolor=#fefefe
| 133917 ||  || — || September 10, 2004 || Socorro || LINEAR || — || align=right | 1.4 km || 
|-id=918 bgcolor=#fefefe
| 133918 ||  || — || September 15, 2004 || Kitt Peak || Spacewatch || — || align=right | 1.2 km || 
|-id=919 bgcolor=#fefefe
| 133919 ||  || — || September 8, 2004 || Socorro || LINEAR || H || align=right | 1.5 km || 
|-id=920 bgcolor=#d6d6d6
| 133920 ||  || — || September 13, 2004 || Kitt Peak || Spacewatch || EOS || align=right | 4.1 km || 
|-id=921 bgcolor=#E9E9E9
| 133921 ||  || — || September 15, 2004 || Kitt Peak || Spacewatch || — || align=right | 4.3 km || 
|-id=922 bgcolor=#fefefe
| 133922 ||  || — || September 9, 2004 || Palomar || NEAT || H || align=right | 1.2 km || 
|-id=923 bgcolor=#E9E9E9
| 133923 ||  || — || September 17, 2004 || Socorro || LINEAR || — || align=right | 4.5 km || 
|-id=924 bgcolor=#fefefe
| 133924 ||  || — || September 17, 2004 || Kitt Peak || Spacewatch || NYS || align=right data-sort-value="0.91" | 910 m || 
|-id=925 bgcolor=#d6d6d6
| 133925 ||  || — || September 17, 2004 || Socorro || LINEAR || THM || align=right | 3.2 km || 
|-id=926 bgcolor=#fefefe
| 133926 ||  || — || September 17, 2004 || Socorro || LINEAR || FLO || align=right data-sort-value="0.88" | 880 m || 
|-id=927 bgcolor=#E9E9E9
| 133927 ||  || — || September 17, 2004 || Socorro || LINEAR || — || align=right | 2.9 km || 
|-id=928 bgcolor=#E9E9E9
| 133928 ||  || — || September 17, 2004 || Socorro || LINEAR || — || align=right | 1.5 km || 
|-id=929 bgcolor=#E9E9E9
| 133929 ||  || — || September 17, 2004 || Socorro || LINEAR || — || align=right | 2.7 km || 
|-id=930 bgcolor=#fefefe
| 133930 ||  || — || September 17, 2004 || Socorro || LINEAR || — || align=right | 1.7 km || 
|-id=931 bgcolor=#E9E9E9
| 133931 ||  || — || September 21, 2004 || Socorro || LINEAR || — || align=right | 6.3 km || 
|-id=932 bgcolor=#fefefe
| 133932 ||  || — || September 22, 2004 || Socorro || LINEAR || — || align=right | 1.7 km || 
|-id=933 bgcolor=#E9E9E9
| 133933 ||  || — || September 22, 2004 || Socorro || LINEAR || — || align=right | 1.9 km || 
|-id=934 bgcolor=#fefefe
| 133934 || 2004 TQ || — || October 4, 2004 || Anderson Mesa || LONEOS || FLO || align=right | 1.1 km || 
|-id=935 bgcolor=#d6d6d6
| 133935 ||  || — || October 4, 2004 || Goodricke-Pigott || R. A. Tucker || — || align=right | 5.4 km || 
|-id=936 bgcolor=#fefefe
| 133936 ||  || — || October 6, 2004 || Socorro || LINEAR || H || align=right | 1.2 km || 
|-id=937 bgcolor=#fefefe
| 133937 ||  || — || October 4, 2004 || Anderson Mesa || LONEOS || H || align=right data-sort-value="0.92" | 920 m || 
|-id=938 bgcolor=#d6d6d6
| 133938 ||  || — || October 12, 2004 || Socorro || LINEAR || Tj (2.93) || align=right | 5.3 km || 
|-id=939 bgcolor=#fefefe
| 133939 ||  || — || October 4, 2004 || Kitt Peak || Spacewatch || — || align=right data-sort-value="0.86" | 860 m || 
|-id=940 bgcolor=#fefefe
| 133940 ||  || — || October 4, 2004 || Kitt Peak || Spacewatch || EUT || align=right | 1.3 km || 
|-id=941 bgcolor=#fefefe
| 133941 ||  || — || October 4, 2004 || Kitt Peak || Spacewatch || — || align=right | 1.2 km || 
|-id=942 bgcolor=#fefefe
| 133942 ||  || — || October 4, 2004 || Kitt Peak || Spacewatch || PHO || align=right | 2.2 km || 
|-id=943 bgcolor=#fefefe
| 133943 ||  || — || October 5, 2004 || Kitt Peak || Spacewatch || MAS || align=right | 1.2 km || 
|-id=944 bgcolor=#d6d6d6
| 133944 ||  || — || October 5, 2004 || Anderson Mesa || LONEOS || TEL || align=right | 2.3 km || 
|-id=945 bgcolor=#fefefe
| 133945 ||  || — || October 5, 2004 || Anderson Mesa || LONEOS || FLO || align=right data-sort-value="0.93" | 930 m || 
|-id=946 bgcolor=#fefefe
| 133946 ||  || — || October 6, 2004 || Kitt Peak || Spacewatch || FLO || align=right | 1.1 km || 
|-id=947 bgcolor=#fefefe
| 133947 ||  || — || October 6, 2004 || Kitt Peak || Spacewatch || V || align=right | 1.4 km || 
|-id=948 bgcolor=#E9E9E9
| 133948 ||  || — || October 6, 2004 || Kitt Peak || Spacewatch || — || align=right | 1.8 km || 
|-id=949 bgcolor=#fefefe
| 133949 ||  || — || October 6, 2004 || Kitt Peak || Spacewatch || FLO || align=right | 1.3 km || 
|-id=950 bgcolor=#d6d6d6
| 133950 ||  || — || October 4, 2004 || Socorro || LINEAR || — || align=right | 5.9 km || 
|-id=951 bgcolor=#fefefe
| 133951 ||  || — || October 5, 2004 || Kitt Peak || Spacewatch || NYS || align=right | 1.5 km || 
|-id=952 bgcolor=#E9E9E9
| 133952 ||  || — || October 7, 2004 || Socorro || LINEAR || — || align=right | 2.9 km || 
|-id=953 bgcolor=#d6d6d6
| 133953 ||  || — || October 7, 2004 || Socorro || LINEAR || — || align=right | 7.7 km || 
|-id=954 bgcolor=#E9E9E9
| 133954 ||  || — || October 7, 2004 || Socorro || LINEAR || — || align=right | 1.8 km || 
|-id=955 bgcolor=#fefefe
| 133955 ||  || — || October 7, 2004 || Socorro || LINEAR || — || align=right | 1.7 km || 
|-id=956 bgcolor=#fefefe
| 133956 ||  || — || October 7, 2004 || Anderson Mesa || LONEOS || FLO || align=right data-sort-value="0.98" | 980 m || 
|-id=957 bgcolor=#E9E9E9
| 133957 ||  || — || October 7, 2004 || Palomar || NEAT || — || align=right | 3.5 km || 
|-id=958 bgcolor=#d6d6d6
| 133958 ||  || — || October 7, 2004 || Anderson Mesa || LONEOS || — || align=right | 4.8 km || 
|-id=959 bgcolor=#fefefe
| 133959 ||  || — || October 7, 2004 || Palomar || NEAT || FLO || align=right | 1.0 km || 
|-id=960 bgcolor=#E9E9E9
| 133960 ||  || — || October 7, 2004 || Palomar || NEAT || — || align=right | 3.4 km || 
|-id=961 bgcolor=#fefefe
| 133961 ||  || — || October 8, 2004 || Anderson Mesa || LONEOS || — || align=right | 1.5 km || 
|-id=962 bgcolor=#E9E9E9
| 133962 ||  || — || October 8, 2004 || Anderson Mesa || LONEOS || — || align=right | 3.3 km || 
|-id=963 bgcolor=#d6d6d6
| 133963 ||  || — || October 9, 2004 || Anderson Mesa || LONEOS || — || align=right | 4.9 km || 
|-id=964 bgcolor=#fefefe
| 133964 ||  || — || October 6, 2004 || Kitt Peak || Spacewatch || — || align=right data-sort-value="0.77" | 770 m || 
|-id=965 bgcolor=#E9E9E9
| 133965 ||  || — || October 6, 2004 || Kitt Peak || Spacewatch || — || align=right | 1.3 km || 
|-id=966 bgcolor=#d6d6d6
| 133966 ||  || — || October 6, 2004 || Kitt Peak || Spacewatch || — || align=right | 3.9 km || 
|-id=967 bgcolor=#fefefe
| 133967 ||  || — || October 7, 2004 || Kitt Peak || Spacewatch || — || align=right | 1.3 km || 
|-id=968 bgcolor=#fefefe
| 133968 ||  || — || October 7, 2004 || Kitt Peak || Spacewatch || — || align=right | 1.5 km || 
|-id=969 bgcolor=#E9E9E9
| 133969 ||  || — || October 7, 2004 || Kitt Peak || Spacewatch || — || align=right | 2.9 km || 
|-id=970 bgcolor=#E9E9E9
| 133970 ||  || — || October 7, 2004 || Kitt Peak || Spacewatch || XIZ || align=right | 2.8 km || 
|-id=971 bgcolor=#E9E9E9
| 133971 ||  || — || October 7, 2004 || Kitt Peak || Spacewatch || RAF || align=right | 1.6 km || 
|-id=972 bgcolor=#E9E9E9
| 133972 ||  || — || October 7, 2004 || Kitt Peak || Spacewatch || — || align=right | 1.3 km || 
|-id=973 bgcolor=#E9E9E9
| 133973 ||  || — || October 7, 2004 || Kitt Peak || Spacewatch || — || align=right | 1.9 km || 
|-id=974 bgcolor=#fefefe
| 133974 ||  || — || October 7, 2004 || Kitt Peak || Spacewatch || — || align=right | 2.5 km || 
|-id=975 bgcolor=#d6d6d6
| 133975 ||  || — || October 9, 2004 || Anderson Mesa || LONEOS || — || align=right | 2.3 km || 
|-id=976 bgcolor=#E9E9E9
| 133976 ||  || — || October 5, 2004 || Kitt Peak || Spacewatch || — || align=right | 1.3 km || 
|-id=977 bgcolor=#d6d6d6
| 133977 ||  || — || October 10, 2004 || Socorro || LINEAR || — || align=right | 6.2 km || 
|-id=978 bgcolor=#fefefe
| 133978 ||  || — || October 6, 2004 || Anderson Mesa || LONEOS || — || align=right | 1.3 km || 
|-id=979 bgcolor=#d6d6d6
| 133979 ||  || — || October 6, 2004 || Socorro || LINEAR || — || align=right | 5.5 km || 
|-id=980 bgcolor=#E9E9E9
| 133980 ||  || — || October 9, 2004 || Kitt Peak || Spacewatch || — || align=right | 1.3 km || 
|-id=981 bgcolor=#fefefe
| 133981 ||  || — || October 9, 2004 || Kitt Peak || Spacewatch || NYS || align=right data-sort-value="0.93" | 930 m || 
|-id=982 bgcolor=#d6d6d6
| 133982 ||  || — || October 9, 2004 || Kitt Peak || Spacewatch || LIX || align=right | 5.2 km || 
|-id=983 bgcolor=#E9E9E9
| 133983 ||  || — || October 7, 2004 || Anderson Mesa || LONEOS || — || align=right | 1.6 km || 
|-id=984 bgcolor=#fefefe
| 133984 ||  || — || October 10, 2004 || Kitt Peak || Spacewatch || — || align=right | 1.4 km || 
|-id=985 bgcolor=#E9E9E9
| 133985 ||  || — || October 11, 2004 || Kitt Peak || Spacewatch || BRG || align=right | 2.2 km || 
|-id=986 bgcolor=#fefefe
| 133986 ||  || — || October 9, 2004 || Kitt Peak || Spacewatch || — || align=right | 1.9 km || 
|-id=987 bgcolor=#fefefe
| 133987 ||  || — || October 10, 2004 || Kitt Peak || Spacewatch || — || align=right | 2.5 km || 
|-id=988 bgcolor=#d6d6d6
| 133988 ||  || — || October 12, 2004 || Anderson Mesa || LONEOS || TIR || align=right | 4.0 km || 
|-id=989 bgcolor=#fefefe
| 133989 ||  || — || October 10, 2004 || Kitt Peak || Spacewatch || — || align=right | 1.6 km || 
|-id=990 bgcolor=#E9E9E9
| 133990 ||  || — || October 14, 2004 || Anderson Mesa || LONEOS || — || align=right | 4.8 km || 
|-id=991 bgcolor=#fefefe
| 133991 ||  || — || October 9, 2004 || Kitt Peak || Spacewatch || — || align=right | 1.3 km || 
|-id=992 bgcolor=#E9E9E9
| 133992 ||  || — || October 16, 2004 || Socorro || LINEAR || — || align=right | 2.5 km || 
|-id=993 bgcolor=#fefefe
| 133993 ||  || — || October 20, 2004 || Socorro || LINEAR || — || align=right | 1.4 km || 
|-id=994 bgcolor=#fefefe
| 133994 ||  || — || November 2, 2004 || Anderson Mesa || LONEOS || — || align=right | 1.1 km || 
|-id=995 bgcolor=#fefefe
| 133995 ||  || — || November 2, 2004 || Anderson Mesa || LONEOS || — || align=right | 1.3 km || 
|-id=996 bgcolor=#fefefe
| 133996 ||  || — || November 3, 2004 || Kitt Peak || Spacewatch || MAS || align=right | 1.2 km || 
|-id=997 bgcolor=#fefefe
| 133997 ||  || — || November 3, 2004 || Kitt Peak || Spacewatch || NYS || align=right | 1.1 km || 
|-id=998 bgcolor=#fefefe
| 133998 ||  || — || November 3, 2004 || Kitt Peak || Spacewatch || — || align=right | 1.1 km || 
|-id=999 bgcolor=#fefefe
| 133999 ||  || — || November 3, 2004 || Kitt Peak || Spacewatch || NYS || align=right | 1.1 km || 
|-id=000 bgcolor=#d6d6d6
| 134000 ||  || — || November 3, 2004 || Anderson Mesa || LONEOS || EOS || align=right | 3.9 km || 
|}

References

External links 
 Discovery Circumstances: Numbered Minor Planets (130001)–(135000) (IAU Minor Planet Center)

0133